

488001–488100 

|-bgcolor=#E9E9E9
| 488001 ||  || — || April 22, 2009 || Mount Lemmon || Mount Lemmon Survey || WIT || align=right data-sort-value="0.92" | 920 m || 
|-id=002 bgcolor=#fefefe
| 488002 ||  || — || July 26, 2011 || Haleakala || Pan-STARRS || — || align=right data-sort-value="0.78" | 780 m || 
|-id=003 bgcolor=#E9E9E9
| 488003 ||  || — || November 16, 2006 || Kitt Peak || Spacewatch || AGN || align=right | 1.00 km || 
|-id=004 bgcolor=#E9E9E9
| 488004 ||  || — || March 15, 2004 || Kitt Peak || Spacewatch || — || align=right | 2.5 km || 
|-id=005 bgcolor=#E9E9E9
| 488005 ||  || — || September 28, 2006 || Kitt Peak || Spacewatch || — || align=right | 2.1 km || 
|-id=006 bgcolor=#E9E9E9
| 488006 ||  || — || November 3, 2011 || Kitt Peak || Spacewatch || (5) || align=right data-sort-value="0.72" | 720 m || 
|-id=007 bgcolor=#E9E9E9
| 488007 ||  || — || October 23, 2006 || Mount Lemmon || Mount Lemmon Survey || AGN || align=right | 1.1 km || 
|-id=008 bgcolor=#d6d6d6
| 488008 ||  || — || November 12, 2010 || Mount Lemmon || Mount Lemmon Survey || — || align=right | 2.3 km || 
|-id=009 bgcolor=#E9E9E9
| 488009 ||  || — || October 8, 2007 || Mount Lemmon || Mount Lemmon Survey || — || align=right data-sort-value="0.89" | 890 m || 
|-id=010 bgcolor=#E9E9E9
| 488010 ||  || — || March 4, 2005 || Mount Lemmon || Mount Lemmon Survey || — || align=right data-sort-value="0.94" | 940 m || 
|-id=011 bgcolor=#E9E9E9
| 488011 ||  || — || February 14, 2008 || Mount Lemmon || Mount Lemmon Survey || — || align=right | 1.8 km || 
|-id=012 bgcolor=#E9E9E9
| 488012 ||  || — || October 29, 2011 || Kitt Peak || Spacewatch || — || align=right | 1.8 km || 
|-id=013 bgcolor=#E9E9E9
| 488013 ||  || — || September 17, 1996 || Kitt Peak || Spacewatch || AGN || align=right data-sort-value="0.91" | 910 m || 
|-id=014 bgcolor=#d6d6d6
| 488014 ||  || — || March 16, 2012 || Haleakala || Pan-STARRS || — || align=right | 4.0 km || 
|-id=015 bgcolor=#d6d6d6
| 488015 ||  || — || January 23, 2006 || Kitt Peak || Spacewatch || — || align=right | 2.4 km || 
|-id=016 bgcolor=#d6d6d6
| 488016 ||  || — || August 22, 2004 || Kitt Peak || Spacewatch || — || align=right | 2.4 km || 
|-id=017 bgcolor=#E9E9E9
| 488017 ||  || — || October 23, 2001 || Kitt Peak || Spacewatch || — || align=right | 1.9 km || 
|-id=018 bgcolor=#E9E9E9
| 488018 ||  || — || February 13, 2004 || Kitt Peak || Spacewatch || — || align=right | 1.2 km || 
|-id=019 bgcolor=#d6d6d6
| 488019 ||  || — || November 11, 1999 || Kitt Peak || Spacewatch || — || align=right | 2.2 km || 
|-id=020 bgcolor=#E9E9E9
| 488020 ||  || — || January 12, 2008 || Mount Lemmon || Mount Lemmon Survey || — || align=right | 1.5 km || 
|-id=021 bgcolor=#d6d6d6
| 488021 ||  || — || September 17, 2010 || Mount Lemmon || Mount Lemmon Survey || KOR || align=right | 1.1 km || 
|-id=022 bgcolor=#fefefe
| 488022 ||  || — || May 22, 2003 || Kitt Peak || Spacewatch || V || align=right data-sort-value="0.65" | 650 m || 
|-id=023 bgcolor=#fefefe
| 488023 ||  || — || May 11, 2010 || Mount Lemmon || Mount Lemmon Survey || — || align=right data-sort-value="0.81" | 810 m || 
|-id=024 bgcolor=#d6d6d6
| 488024 ||  || — || November 12, 2010 || Mount Lemmon || Mount Lemmon Survey || — || align=right | 2.6 km || 
|-id=025 bgcolor=#d6d6d6
| 488025 ||  || — || October 9, 1999 || Socorro || LINEAR || — || align=right | 2.4 km || 
|-id=026 bgcolor=#E9E9E9
| 488026 ||  || — || October 22, 2006 || Kitt Peak || Spacewatch || AGN || align=right | 1.3 km || 
|-id=027 bgcolor=#E9E9E9
| 488027 ||  || — || October 2, 2006 || Mount Lemmon || Mount Lemmon Survey || AGN || align=right data-sort-value="0.92" | 920 m || 
|-id=028 bgcolor=#E9E9E9
| 488028 ||  || — || December 22, 2008 || Kitt Peak || Spacewatch || — || align=right data-sort-value="0.88" | 880 m || 
|-id=029 bgcolor=#d6d6d6
| 488029 ||  || — || August 30, 2005 || Kitt Peak || Spacewatch || KOR || align=right | 1.5 km || 
|-id=030 bgcolor=#E9E9E9
| 488030 ||  || — || October 3, 2006 || Mount Lemmon || Mount Lemmon Survey || — || align=right | 2.0 km || 
|-id=031 bgcolor=#E9E9E9
| 488031 ||  || — || September 30, 2006 || Mount Lemmon || Mount Lemmon Survey || — || align=right | 1.7 km || 
|-id=032 bgcolor=#E9E9E9
| 488032 ||  || — || November 7, 2007 || Catalina || CSS || — || align=right | 1.2 km || 
|-id=033 bgcolor=#fefefe
| 488033 ||  || — || December 28, 2005 || Kitt Peak || Spacewatch || — || align=right data-sort-value="0.81" | 810 m || 
|-id=034 bgcolor=#E9E9E9
| 488034 ||  || — || October 25, 2011 || Haleakala || Pan-STARRS || — || align=right data-sort-value="0.95" | 950 m || 
|-id=035 bgcolor=#fefefe
| 488035 ||  || — || March 26, 2006 || Mount Lemmon || Mount Lemmon Survey || MAS || align=right data-sort-value="0.67" | 670 m || 
|-id=036 bgcolor=#fefefe
| 488036 ||  || — || August 30, 2005 || Kitt Peak || Spacewatch || — || align=right data-sort-value="0.78" | 780 m || 
|-id=037 bgcolor=#d6d6d6
| 488037 ||  || — || April 19, 2013 || Haleakala || Pan-STARRS || — || align=right | 2.1 km || 
|-id=038 bgcolor=#d6d6d6
| 488038 ||  || — || January 5, 2006 || Kitt Peak || Spacewatch || — || align=right | 2.0 km || 
|-id=039 bgcolor=#d6d6d6
| 488039 ||  || — || December 25, 2005 || Kitt Peak || Spacewatch || — || align=right | 2.4 km || 
|-id=040 bgcolor=#d6d6d6
| 488040 ||  || — || March 11, 2007 || Kitt Peak || Spacewatch || EOS || align=right | 1.8 km || 
|-id=041 bgcolor=#d6d6d6
| 488041 ||  || — || December 7, 2005 || Kitt Peak || Spacewatch || — || align=right | 2.9 km || 
|-id=042 bgcolor=#fefefe
| 488042 ||  || — || January 29, 2009 || Mount Lemmon || Mount Lemmon Survey || — || align=right | 1.0 km || 
|-id=043 bgcolor=#d6d6d6
| 488043 ||  || — || April 5, 2008 || Mount Lemmon || Mount Lemmon Survey || — || align=right | 2.1 km || 
|-id=044 bgcolor=#d6d6d6
| 488044 ||  || — || July 2, 2014 || Haleakala || Pan-STARRS || EOS || align=right | 1.3 km || 
|-id=045 bgcolor=#d6d6d6
| 488045 ||  || — || May 12, 2013 || Haleakala || Pan-STARRS || — || align=right | 2.6 km || 
|-id=046 bgcolor=#d6d6d6
| 488046 ||  || — || May 12, 2013 || Haleakala || Pan-STARRS || — || align=right | 2.7 km || 
|-id=047 bgcolor=#E9E9E9
| 488047 ||  || — || December 1, 2011 || Haleakala || Pan-STARRS || — || align=right | 1.0 km || 
|-id=048 bgcolor=#d6d6d6
| 488048 ||  || — || August 30, 2014 || Mount Lemmon || Mount Lemmon Survey || — || align=right | 2.9 km || 
|-id=049 bgcolor=#d6d6d6
| 488049 ||  || — || July 27, 2014 || Haleakala || Pan-STARRS || — || align=right | 2.6 km || 
|-id=050 bgcolor=#d6d6d6
| 488050 ||  || — || February 16, 2012 || Haleakala || Pan-STARRS || critical || align=right | 2.7 km || 
|-id=051 bgcolor=#E9E9E9
| 488051 ||  || — || January 16, 2004 || Kitt Peak || Spacewatch || — || align=right | 1.5 km || 
|-id=052 bgcolor=#E9E9E9
| 488052 ||  || — || February 8, 2008 || Kitt Peak || Spacewatch || — || align=right | 2.3 km || 
|-id=053 bgcolor=#d6d6d6
| 488053 ||  || — || January 7, 2000 || Kitt Peak || Spacewatch || — || align=right | 2.5 km || 
|-id=054 bgcolor=#d6d6d6
| 488054 ||  || — || September 15, 2009 || Kitt Peak || Spacewatch || THM || align=right | 1.9 km || 
|-id=055 bgcolor=#d6d6d6
| 488055 ||  || — || April 13, 2013 || Haleakala || Pan-STARRS || — || align=right | 2.7 km || 
|-id=056 bgcolor=#d6d6d6
| 488056 ||  || — || July 25, 2014 || Haleakala || Pan-STARRS || 3:2critical || align=right | 3.2 km || 
|-id=057 bgcolor=#E9E9E9
| 488057 ||  || — || October 19, 2011 || Mount Lemmon || Mount Lemmon Survey || — || align=right | 1.2 km || 
|-id=058 bgcolor=#E9E9E9
| 488058 ||  || — || August 28, 2006 || Kitt Peak || Spacewatch || — || align=right | 1.5 km || 
|-id=059 bgcolor=#d6d6d6
| 488059 ||  || — || October 29, 2010 || Kitt Peak || Spacewatch || EOS || align=right | 1.9 km || 
|-id=060 bgcolor=#E9E9E9
| 488060 ||  || — || August 21, 2006 || Kitt Peak || Spacewatch || — || align=right | 1.5 km || 
|-id=061 bgcolor=#d6d6d6
| 488061 ||  || — || September 16, 2009 || Catalina || CSS || — || align=right | 2.6 km || 
|-id=062 bgcolor=#E9E9E9
| 488062 ||  || — || March 24, 2013 || Mount Lemmon || Mount Lemmon Survey || — || align=right | 1.5 km || 
|-id=063 bgcolor=#d6d6d6
| 488063 ||  || — || October 18, 2009 || Mount Lemmon || Mount Lemmon Survey || — || align=right | 2.9 km || 
|-id=064 bgcolor=#d6d6d6
| 488064 ||  || — || June 24, 2009 || Mount Lemmon || Mount Lemmon Survey || — || align=right | 2.7 km || 
|-id=065 bgcolor=#E9E9E9
| 488065 ||  || — || October 28, 2006 || Kitt Peak || Spacewatch || AGN || align=right | 1.1 km || 
|-id=066 bgcolor=#fefefe
| 488066 ||  || — || September 9, 2015 || Haleakala || Pan-STARRS || — || align=right data-sort-value="0.88" | 880 m || 
|-id=067 bgcolor=#d6d6d6
| 488067 ||  || — || July 2, 2014 || Mount Lemmon || Mount Lemmon Survey || — || align=right | 3.2 km || 
|-id=068 bgcolor=#d6d6d6
| 488068 ||  || — || July 27, 2014 || Haleakala || Pan-STARRS || — || align=right | 2.6 km || 
|-id=069 bgcolor=#E9E9E9
| 488069 ||  || — || March 28, 2009 || Kitt Peak || Spacewatch || — || align=right | 1.2 km || 
|-id=070 bgcolor=#d6d6d6
| 488070 ||  || — || August 22, 2014 || Haleakala || Pan-STARRS || — || align=right | 2.7 km || 
|-id=071 bgcolor=#E9E9E9
| 488071 ||  || — || April 20, 2009 || Mount Lemmon || Mount Lemmon Survey || — || align=right | 1.4 km || 
|-id=072 bgcolor=#E9E9E9
| 488072 ||  || — || October 25, 2011 || Haleakala || Pan-STARRS || — || align=right | 1.3 km || 
|-id=073 bgcolor=#E9E9E9
| 488073 ||  || — || March 12, 2005 || Kitt Peak || Spacewatch || — || align=right | 1.3 km || 
|-id=074 bgcolor=#fefefe
| 488074 ||  || — || January 31, 2013 || Mount Lemmon || Mount Lemmon Survey || — || align=right data-sort-value="0.99" | 990 m || 
|-id=075 bgcolor=#fefefe
| 488075 ||  || — || June 5, 2014 || Haleakala || Pan-STARRS || — || align=right | 1.1 km || 
|-id=076 bgcolor=#d6d6d6
| 488076 ||  || — || July 27, 2009 || Kitt Peak || Spacewatch || — || align=right | 2.8 km || 
|-id=077 bgcolor=#d6d6d6
| 488077 ||  || — || August 27, 2009 || La Sagra || OAM Obs. || — || align=right | 3.5 km || 
|-id=078 bgcolor=#E9E9E9
| 488078 ||  || — || January 21, 2004 || Socorro || LINEAR || — || align=right | 1.5 km || 
|-id=079 bgcolor=#E9E9E9
| 488079 ||  || — || December 22, 2006 || Kitt Peak || Spacewatch || — || align=right | 2.0 km || 
|-id=080 bgcolor=#E9E9E9
| 488080 ||  || — || October 18, 2006 || Kitt Peak || Spacewatch || — || align=right | 2.7 km || 
|-id=081 bgcolor=#d6d6d6
| 488081 ||  || — || October 10, 2005 || Catalina || CSS || — || align=right | 2.6 km || 
|-id=082 bgcolor=#d6d6d6
| 488082 ||  || — || July 4, 2014 || Haleakala || Pan-STARRS || — || align=right | 2.3 km || 
|-id=083 bgcolor=#d6d6d6
| 488083 ||  || — || September 27, 2009 || Mount Lemmon || Mount Lemmon Survey || — || align=right | 2.9 km || 
|-id=084 bgcolor=#E9E9E9
| 488084 ||  || — || September 19, 2006 || Anderson Mesa || LONEOS || — || align=right | 1.7 km || 
|-id=085 bgcolor=#E9E9E9
| 488085 ||  || — || July 21, 2006 || Mount Lemmon || Mount Lemmon Survey || — || align=right | 1.8 km || 
|-id=086 bgcolor=#d6d6d6
| 488086 ||  || — || August 20, 2014 || Haleakala || Pan-STARRS || — || align=right | 2.8 km || 
|-id=087 bgcolor=#E9E9E9
| 488087 ||  || — || November 16, 2006 || Catalina || CSS || — || align=right | 1.7 km || 
|-id=088 bgcolor=#E9E9E9
| 488088 ||  || — || October 2, 2006 || Mount Lemmon || Mount Lemmon Survey || — || align=right | 1.9 km || 
|-id=089 bgcolor=#d6d6d6
| 488089 ||  || — || February 26, 2012 || Haleakala || Pan-STARRS || — || align=right | 2.9 km || 
|-id=090 bgcolor=#d6d6d6
| 488090 ||  || — || May 12, 2013 || Haleakala || Pan-STARRS || — || align=right | 3.1 km || 
|-id=091 bgcolor=#d6d6d6
| 488091 ||  || — || February 1, 2012 || Mount Lemmon || Mount Lemmon Survey || EOS || align=right | 1.8 km || 
|-id=092 bgcolor=#E9E9E9
| 488092 ||  || — || May 30, 2010 || WISE || WISE || DOR || align=right | 3.7 km || 
|-id=093 bgcolor=#d6d6d6
| 488093 ||  || — || October 10, 1999 || Kitt Peak || Spacewatch || EOS || align=right | 1.8 km || 
|-id=094 bgcolor=#fefefe
| 488094 ||  || — || March 12, 2007 || Kitt Peak || Spacewatch || — || align=right data-sort-value="0.78" | 780 m || 
|-id=095 bgcolor=#E9E9E9
| 488095 ||  || — || March 4, 2005 || Mount Lemmon || Mount Lemmon Survey || EUN || align=right | 1.2 km || 
|-id=096 bgcolor=#E9E9E9
| 488096 ||  || — || May 15, 2005 || Kitt Peak || Spacewatch || EUN || align=right | 1.2 km || 
|-id=097 bgcolor=#d6d6d6
| 488097 ||  || — || December 11, 2010 || Kitt Peak || Spacewatch || VER || align=right | 2.3 km || 
|-id=098 bgcolor=#d6d6d6
| 488098 ||  || — || February 26, 2012 || Haleakala || Pan-STARRS || — || align=right | 2.8 km || 
|-id=099 bgcolor=#d6d6d6
| 488099 ||  || — || December 28, 2005 || Kitt Peak || Spacewatch || — || align=right | 2.4 km || 
|-id=100 bgcolor=#d6d6d6
| 488100 ||  || — || August 3, 2014 || Haleakala || Pan-STARRS || — || align=right | 2.8 km || 
|}

488101–488200 

|-bgcolor=#d6d6d6
| 488101 ||  || — || September 24, 2009 || La Sagra || OAM Obs. || — || align=right | 4.4 km || 
|-id=102 bgcolor=#d6d6d6
| 488102 ||  || — || November 3, 2010 || Kitt Peak || Spacewatch || — || align=right | 2.7 km || 
|-id=103 bgcolor=#d6d6d6
| 488103 ||  || — || July 1, 2014 || Haleakala || Pan-STARRS || LIX || align=right | 3.3 km || 
|-id=104 bgcolor=#fefefe
| 488104 ||  || — || May 9, 2007 || Mount Lemmon || Mount Lemmon Survey || — || align=right data-sort-value="0.99" | 990 m || 
|-id=105 bgcolor=#d6d6d6
| 488105 ||  || — || September 28, 2003 || Kitt Peak || Spacewatch || — || align=right | 2.1 km || 
|-id=106 bgcolor=#E9E9E9
| 488106 ||  || — || April 10, 2005 || Mount Lemmon || Mount Lemmon Survey || — || align=right data-sort-value="0.94" | 940 m || 
|-id=107 bgcolor=#d6d6d6
| 488107 ||  || — || June 27, 2014 || Haleakala || Pan-STARRS || — || align=right | 2.6 km || 
|-id=108 bgcolor=#d6d6d6
| 488108 ||  || — || December 8, 2010 || Mount Lemmon || Mount Lemmon Survey || — || align=right | 2.8 km || 
|-id=109 bgcolor=#E9E9E9
| 488109 ||  || — || June 17, 2010 || WISE || WISE || DOR || align=right | 2.5 km || 
|-id=110 bgcolor=#E9E9E9
| 488110 ||  || — || December 31, 2007 || Mount Lemmon || Mount Lemmon Survey || — || align=right | 1.4 km || 
|-id=111 bgcolor=#E9E9E9
| 488111 ||  || — || October 16, 2006 || Catalina || CSS || NEM || align=right | 2.2 km || 
|-id=112 bgcolor=#E9E9E9
| 488112 ||  || — || November 17, 2006 || Mount Lemmon || Mount Lemmon Survey || AGN || align=right | 1.3 km || 
|-id=113 bgcolor=#d6d6d6
| 488113 ||  || — || April 17, 2013 || Haleakala || Pan-STARRS || EOS || align=right | 1.8 km || 
|-id=114 bgcolor=#d6d6d6
| 488114 ||  || — || August 17, 2009 || La Sagra || OAM Obs. || LIX || align=right | 3.3 km || 
|-id=115 bgcolor=#fefefe
| 488115 ||  || — || August 24, 2011 || Haleakala || Pan-STARRS || — || align=right data-sort-value="0.88" | 880 m || 
|-id=116 bgcolor=#fefefe
| 488116 ||  || — || December 7, 2005 || Kitt Peak || Spacewatch || — || align=right data-sort-value="0.77" | 770 m || 
|-id=117 bgcolor=#E9E9E9
| 488117 ||  || — || October 3, 2006 || Mount Lemmon || Mount Lemmon Survey || — || align=right | 1.9 km || 
|-id=118 bgcolor=#d6d6d6
| 488118 ||  || — || December 17, 2001 || Socorro || LINEAR || — || align=right | 3.5 km || 
|-id=119 bgcolor=#d6d6d6
| 488119 ||  || — || February 20, 2012 || Haleakala || Pan-STARRS || EOS || align=right | 2.2 km || 
|-id=120 bgcolor=#E9E9E9
| 488120 ||  || — || February 8, 2008 || Mount Lemmon || Mount Lemmon Survey || HOF || align=right | 2.7 km || 
|-id=121 bgcolor=#d6d6d6
| 488121 ||  || — || August 4, 2003 || Kitt Peak || Spacewatch || — || align=right | 3.3 km || 
|-id=122 bgcolor=#E9E9E9
| 488122 ||  || — || October 19, 2007 || Mount Lemmon || Mount Lemmon Survey || — || align=right | 1.6 km || 
|-id=123 bgcolor=#d6d6d6
| 488123 ||  || — || October 1, 2010 || Catalina || CSS || — || align=right | 2.8 km || 
|-id=124 bgcolor=#E9E9E9
| 488124 ||  || — || October 27, 2006 || Catalina || CSS || — || align=right | 2.4 km || 
|-id=125 bgcolor=#d6d6d6
| 488125 ||  || — || January 31, 2006 || Kitt Peak || Spacewatch || — || align=right | 2.8 km || 
|-id=126 bgcolor=#d6d6d6
| 488126 ||  || — || April 10, 2013 || Haleakala || Pan-STARRS || — || align=right | 2.9 km || 
|-id=127 bgcolor=#E9E9E9
| 488127 ||  || — || June 4, 2014 || Haleakala || Pan-STARRS || — || align=right | 2.5 km || 
|-id=128 bgcolor=#d6d6d6
| 488128 ||  || — || March 9, 2007 || Mount Lemmon || Mount Lemmon Survey || — || align=right | 2.3 km || 
|-id=129 bgcolor=#d6d6d6
| 488129 ||  || — || March 16, 2012 || Haleakala || Pan-STARRS || — || align=right | 3.1 km || 
|-id=130 bgcolor=#E9E9E9
| 488130 ||  || — || May 26, 2014 || Haleakala || Pan-STARRS || EUN || align=right | 1.2 km || 
|-id=131 bgcolor=#d6d6d6
| 488131 ||  || — || December 10, 2010 || Kitt Peak || Spacewatch || EOS || align=right | 2.2 km || 
|-id=132 bgcolor=#d6d6d6
| 488132 ||  || — || December 10, 2004 || Kitt Peak || Spacewatch || Tj (2.98) || align=right | 3.0 km || 
|-id=133 bgcolor=#E9E9E9
| 488133 ||  || — || October 31, 2011 || Mount Lemmon || Mount Lemmon Survey || — || align=right | 1.3 km || 
|-id=134 bgcolor=#d6d6d6
| 488134 ||  || — || January 9, 2010 || WISE || WISE || — || align=right | 4.4 km || 
|-id=135 bgcolor=#d6d6d6
| 488135 ||  || — || December 7, 2004 || Socorro || LINEAR || — || align=right | 3.4 km || 
|-id=136 bgcolor=#d6d6d6
| 488136 ||  || — || April 16, 2013 || Haleakala || Pan-STARRS || — || align=right | 3.1 km || 
|-id=137 bgcolor=#d6d6d6
| 488137 ||  || — || October 12, 1993 || Kitt Peak || Spacewatch || — || align=right | 3.0 km || 
|-id=138 bgcolor=#fefefe
| 488138 ||  || — || October 29, 2008 || Mount Lemmon || Mount Lemmon Survey || — || align=right data-sort-value="0.71" | 710 m || 
|-id=139 bgcolor=#E9E9E9
| 488139 ||  || — || January 18, 2012 || Mount Lemmon || Mount Lemmon Survey || — || align=right | 2.1 km || 
|-id=140 bgcolor=#d6d6d6
| 488140 ||  || — || September 10, 2005 || Anderson Mesa || LONEOS || — || align=right | 2.7 km || 
|-id=141 bgcolor=#E9E9E9
| 488141 ||  || — || January 19, 2008 || Mount Lemmon || Mount Lemmon Survey || — || align=right | 1.9 km || 
|-id=142 bgcolor=#d6d6d6
| 488142 ||  || — || October 9, 2004 || Kitt Peak || Spacewatch || EOS || align=right | 1.9 km || 
|-id=143 bgcolor=#d6d6d6
| 488143 ||  || — || January 24, 2006 || Anderson Mesa || LONEOS || EOS || align=right | 2.2 km || 
|-id=144 bgcolor=#d6d6d6
| 488144 ||  || — || April 18, 2013 || Haleakala || Pan-STARRS || BRA || align=right | 1.9 km || 
|-id=145 bgcolor=#E9E9E9
| 488145 ||  || — || October 2, 2006 || Mount Lemmon || Mount Lemmon Survey || — || align=right | 1.2 km || 
|-id=146 bgcolor=#d6d6d6
| 488146 ||  || — || September 20, 2009 || Kitt Peak || Spacewatch || — || align=right | 2.7 km || 
|-id=147 bgcolor=#d6d6d6
| 488147 ||  || — || July 26, 2015 || Haleakala || Pan-STARRS || — || align=right | 5.6 km || 
|-id=148 bgcolor=#fefefe
| 488148 ||  || — || September 20, 2011 || Haleakala || Pan-STARRS || — || align=right | 1.0 km || 
|-id=149 bgcolor=#fefefe
| 488149 ||  || — || April 14, 2007 || Kitt Peak || Spacewatch || — || align=right data-sort-value="0.82" | 820 m || 
|-id=150 bgcolor=#d6d6d6
| 488150 ||  || — || December 14, 2010 || Mount Lemmon || Mount Lemmon Survey || — || align=right | 2.3 km || 
|-id=151 bgcolor=#d6d6d6
| 488151 ||  || — || December 28, 2005 || Kitt Peak || Spacewatch || EOS || align=right | 1.8 km || 
|-id=152 bgcolor=#d6d6d6
| 488152 ||  || — || November 15, 2010 || Mount Lemmon || Mount Lemmon Survey || — || align=right | 3.1 km || 
|-id=153 bgcolor=#d6d6d6
| 488153 ||  || — || November 28, 2010 || Mount Lemmon || Mount Lemmon Survey || — || align=right | 2.5 km || 
|-id=154 bgcolor=#d6d6d6
| 488154 ||  || — || September 16, 2009 || Catalina || CSS || EOS || align=right | 2.3 km || 
|-id=155 bgcolor=#d6d6d6
| 488155 ||  || — || January 31, 2006 || Mount Lemmon || Mount Lemmon Survey || — || align=right | 2.1 km || 
|-id=156 bgcolor=#E9E9E9
| 488156 ||  || — || June 12, 2010 || WISE || WISE || — || align=right | 2.6 km || 
|-id=157 bgcolor=#d6d6d6
| 488157 ||  || — || September 16, 2009 || Mount Lemmon || Mount Lemmon Survey || — || align=right | 2.6 km || 
|-id=158 bgcolor=#d6d6d6
| 488158 ||  || — || April 17, 2013 || Haleakala || Pan-STARRS || — || align=right | 3.3 km || 
|-id=159 bgcolor=#E9E9E9
| 488159 ||  || — || January 31, 2012 || Catalina || CSS || — || align=right | 2.3 km || 
|-id=160 bgcolor=#d6d6d6
| 488160 ||  || — || July 25, 2014 || Haleakala || Pan-STARRS || — || align=right | 3.4 km || 
|-id=161 bgcolor=#d6d6d6
| 488161 ||  || — || March 17, 2012 || Mount Lemmon || Mount Lemmon Survey || — || align=right | 2.9 km || 
|-id=162 bgcolor=#d6d6d6
| 488162 ||  || — || June 25, 2014 || Mount Lemmon || Mount Lemmon Survey || — || align=right | 2.1 km || 
|-id=163 bgcolor=#d6d6d6
| 488163 ||  || — || May 27, 2008 || Kitt Peak || Spacewatch || — || align=right | 2.8 km || 
|-id=164 bgcolor=#d6d6d6
| 488164 ||  || — || January 6, 2006 || Mount Lemmon || Mount Lemmon Survey || — || align=right | 2.1 km || 
|-id=165 bgcolor=#E9E9E9
| 488165 ||  || — || October 17, 2006 || Mount Lemmon || Mount Lemmon Survey || — || align=right | 1.3 km || 
|-id=166 bgcolor=#d6d6d6
| 488166 ||  || — || December 27, 2006 || Mount Lemmon || Mount Lemmon Survey || KOR || align=right | 1.2 km || 
|-id=167 bgcolor=#d6d6d6
| 488167 ||  || — || December 13, 2010 || Mount Lemmon || Mount Lemmon Survey || — || align=right | 2.5 km || 
|-id=168 bgcolor=#d6d6d6
| 488168 ||  || — || December 2, 2010 || Kitt Peak || Spacewatch || — || align=right | 2.8 km || 
|-id=169 bgcolor=#d6d6d6
| 488169 ||  || — || November 30, 2010 || Mount Lemmon || Mount Lemmon Survey || — || align=right | 2.9 km || 
|-id=170 bgcolor=#d6d6d6
| 488170 ||  || — || November 23, 2009 || Mount Lemmon || Mount Lemmon Survey || — || align=right | 3.1 km || 
|-id=171 bgcolor=#d6d6d6
| 488171 ||  || — || February 20, 2012 || Haleakala || Pan-STARRS || EOS || align=right | 1.6 km || 
|-id=172 bgcolor=#fefefe
| 488172 ||  || — || October 20, 2003 || Kitt Peak || Spacewatch || — || align=right | 1.1 km || 
|-id=173 bgcolor=#E9E9E9
| 488173 ||  || — || May 10, 2013 || Kitt Peak || Spacewatch || — || align=right data-sort-value="0.90" | 900 m || 
|-id=174 bgcolor=#E9E9E9
| 488174 ||  || — || January 26, 2012 || Haleakala || Pan-STARRS || — || align=right | 1.9 km || 
|-id=175 bgcolor=#d6d6d6
| 488175 ||  || — || December 6, 2010 || Mount Lemmon || Mount Lemmon Survey || — || align=right | 2.4 km || 
|-id=176 bgcolor=#d6d6d6
| 488176 ||  || — || April 17, 2013 || Haleakala || Pan-STARRS || — || align=right | 3.1 km || 
|-id=177 bgcolor=#d6d6d6
| 488177 ||  || — || May 7, 2008 || Mount Lemmon || Mount Lemmon Survey || — || align=right | 3.2 km || 
|-id=178 bgcolor=#d6d6d6
| 488178 ||  || — || December 25, 2005 || Kitt Peak || Spacewatch || — || align=right | 2.4 km || 
|-id=179 bgcolor=#d6d6d6
| 488179 ||  || — || December 20, 2004 || Mount Lemmon || Mount Lemmon Survey || — || align=right | 3.0 km || 
|-id=180 bgcolor=#d6d6d6
| 488180 ||  || — || December 25, 2005 || Kitt Peak || Spacewatch || — || align=right | 3.5 km || 
|-id=181 bgcolor=#E9E9E9
| 488181 ||  || — || April 28, 2009 || Kitt Peak || Spacewatch || MAR || align=right data-sort-value="0.76" | 760 m || 
|-id=182 bgcolor=#d6d6d6
| 488182 ||  || — || January 6, 2006 || Kitt Peak || Spacewatch || EOS || align=right | 1.6 km || 
|-id=183 bgcolor=#d6d6d6
| 488183 ||  || — || September 17, 2009 || Mount Lemmon || Mount Lemmon Survey || EOS || align=right | 1.4 km || 
|-id=184 bgcolor=#d6d6d6
| 488184 ||  || — || February 13, 2007 || Mount Lemmon || Mount Lemmon Survey || — || align=right | 2.0 km || 
|-id=185 bgcolor=#d6d6d6
| 488185 ||  || — || March 24, 2012 || Mount Lemmon || Mount Lemmon Survey || — || align=right | 2.0 km || 
|-id=186 bgcolor=#d6d6d6
| 488186 ||  || — || May 16, 2013 || Mount Lemmon || Mount Lemmon Survey || EOS || align=right | 1.9 km || 
|-id=187 bgcolor=#fefefe
| 488187 ||  || — || June 4, 2014 || Haleakala || Pan-STARRS || — || align=right data-sort-value="0.91" | 910 m || 
|-id=188 bgcolor=#d6d6d6
| 488188 ||  || — || February 20, 2012 || Haleakala || Pan-STARRS || — || align=right | 2.8 km || 
|-id=189 bgcolor=#C2FFFF
| 488189 ||  || — || June 21, 2010 || Mount Lemmon || Mount Lemmon Survey || L5critical || align=right | 9.2 km || 
|-id=190 bgcolor=#d6d6d6
| 488190 ||  || — || February 25, 2007 || Mount Lemmon || Mount Lemmon Survey || — || align=right | 1.9 km || 
|-id=191 bgcolor=#d6d6d6
| 488191 ||  || — || October 5, 2004 || Kitt Peak || Spacewatch || — || align=right | 2.2 km || 
|-id=192 bgcolor=#d6d6d6
| 488192 ||  || — || September 18, 2003 || Kitt Peak || Spacewatch || — || align=right | 2.3 km || 
|-id=193 bgcolor=#d6d6d6
| 488193 ||  || — || March 11, 2007 || Kitt Peak || Spacewatch || — || align=right | 2.6 km || 
|-id=194 bgcolor=#d6d6d6
| 488194 ||  || — || January 22, 2010 || WISE || WISE || — || align=right | 4.1 km || 
|-id=195 bgcolor=#E9E9E9
| 488195 ||  || — || November 12, 2007 || Mount Lemmon || Mount Lemmon Survey || (5) || align=right data-sort-value="0.98" | 980 m || 
|-id=196 bgcolor=#d6d6d6
| 488196 ||  || — || December 2, 2010 || Kitt Peak || Spacewatch || — || align=right | 2.5 km || 
|-id=197 bgcolor=#d6d6d6
| 488197 ||  || — || October 30, 2005 || Kitt Peak || Spacewatch || — || align=right | 1.9 km || 
|-id=198 bgcolor=#d6d6d6
| 488198 ||  || — || November 19, 2004 || Catalina || CSS || EOS || align=right | 1.8 km || 
|-id=199 bgcolor=#d6d6d6
| 488199 ||  || — || October 14, 2009 || Mount Lemmon || Mount Lemmon Survey || — || align=right | 2.7 km || 
|-id=200 bgcolor=#d6d6d6
| 488200 ||  || — || January 17, 2011 || Mount Lemmon || Mount Lemmon Survey || — || align=right | 2.5 km || 
|}

488201–488300 

|-bgcolor=#d6d6d6
| 488201 ||  || — || August 28, 2014 || Haleakala || Pan-STARRS || EOS || align=right | 1.8 km || 
|-id=202 bgcolor=#d6d6d6
| 488202 ||  || — || May 31, 2014 || Haleakala || Pan-STARRS || BRA || align=right | 1.5 km || 
|-id=203 bgcolor=#d6d6d6
| 488203 ||  || — || January 30, 2011 || Haleakala || Pan-STARRS || — || align=right | 3.0 km || 
|-id=204 bgcolor=#d6d6d6
| 488204 ||  || — || February 28, 2012 || Haleakala || Pan-STARRS || — || align=right | 3.8 km || 
|-id=205 bgcolor=#d6d6d6
| 488205 ||  || — || May 18, 2013 || Mount Lemmon || Mount Lemmon Survey || — || align=right | 2.8 km || 
|-id=206 bgcolor=#d6d6d6
| 488206 ||  || — || July 29, 2014 || Haleakala || Pan-STARRS || — || align=right | 2.1 km || 
|-id=207 bgcolor=#d6d6d6
| 488207 ||  || — || August 8, 2004 || Anderson Mesa || LONEOS || — || align=right | 2.6 km || 
|-id=208 bgcolor=#d6d6d6
| 488208 ||  || — || September 15, 2009 || Kitt Peak || Spacewatch || EOS || align=right | 1.8 km || 
|-id=209 bgcolor=#d6d6d6
| 488209 ||  || — || December 10, 2010 || Kitt Peak || Spacewatch || EOS || align=right | 1.6 km || 
|-id=210 bgcolor=#d6d6d6
| 488210 ||  || — || June 3, 2014 || Haleakala || Pan-STARRS || — || align=right | 2.9 km || 
|-id=211 bgcolor=#d6d6d6
| 488211 ||  || — || September 27, 2009 || Mount Lemmon || Mount Lemmon Survey || — || align=right | 2.6 km || 
|-id=212 bgcolor=#d6d6d6
| 488212 ||  || — || September 22, 2009 || La Sagra || OAM Obs. || — || align=right | 3.4 km || 
|-id=213 bgcolor=#d6d6d6
| 488213 ||  || — || December 5, 2005 || Mount Lemmon || Mount Lemmon Survey || — || align=right | 2.1 km || 
|-id=214 bgcolor=#d6d6d6
| 488214 ||  || — || June 28, 2014 || Haleakala || Pan-STARRS || EOS || align=right | 1.6 km || 
|-id=215 bgcolor=#E9E9E9
| 488215 ||  || — || September 8, 2010 || La Sagra || OAM Obs. || — || align=right | 3.3 km || 
|-id=216 bgcolor=#d6d6d6
| 488216 ||  || — || November 3, 2005 || Mount Lemmon || Mount Lemmon Survey || — || align=right | 3.3 km || 
|-id=217 bgcolor=#fefefe
| 488217 ||  || — || October 24, 2011 || Haleakala || Pan-STARRS || — || align=right data-sort-value="0.81" | 810 m || 
|-id=218 bgcolor=#d6d6d6
| 488218 ||  || — || November 20, 2009 || Mount Lemmon || Mount Lemmon Survey || — || align=right | 3.5 km || 
|-id=219 bgcolor=#d6d6d6
| 488219 ||  || — || November 5, 2010 || Mount Lemmon || Mount Lemmon Survey || EOS || align=right | 2.0 km || 
|-id=220 bgcolor=#d6d6d6
| 488220 ||  || — || June 3, 2014 || Haleakala || Pan-STARRS || — || align=right | 3.1 km || 
|-id=221 bgcolor=#d6d6d6
| 488221 ||  || — || July 15, 2004 || Siding Spring || SSS || — || align=right | 3.4 km || 
|-id=222 bgcolor=#E9E9E9
| 488222 ||  || — || January 13, 2004 || Kitt Peak || Spacewatch || — || align=right | 1.5 km || 
|-id=223 bgcolor=#C2FFFF
| 488223 ||  || — || April 27, 2010 || WISE || WISE || L5 || align=right | 14 km || 
|-id=224 bgcolor=#d6d6d6
| 488224 ||  || — || September 6, 2008 || Catalina || CSS || — || align=right | 3.7 km || 
|-id=225 bgcolor=#d6d6d6
| 488225 ||  || — || November 9, 2004 || Catalina || CSS || — || align=right | 3.5 km || 
|-id=226 bgcolor=#d6d6d6
| 488226 ||  || — || November 19, 2003 || Kitt Peak || Spacewatch || — || align=right | 2.7 km || 
|-id=227 bgcolor=#E9E9E9
| 488227 ||  || — || January 18, 2008 || Kitt Peak || Spacewatch || — || align=right | 1.1 km || 
|-id=228 bgcolor=#d6d6d6
| 488228 ||  || — || January 30, 2011 || Kitt Peak || Spacewatch || — || align=right | 4.1 km || 
|-id=229 bgcolor=#E9E9E9
| 488229 ||  || — || October 7, 2005 || Mount Lemmon || Mount Lemmon Survey || — || align=right | 2.6 km || 
|-id=230 bgcolor=#C2FFFF
| 488230 ||  || — || October 6, 2012 || Haleakala || Pan-STARRS || L5 || align=right | 6.8 km || 
|-id=231 bgcolor=#E9E9E9
| 488231 ||  || — || December 13, 2006 || Mount Lemmon || Mount Lemmon Survey || — || align=right | 2.1 km || 
|-id=232 bgcolor=#d6d6d6
| 488232 ||  || — || November 26, 2009 || Mount Lemmon || Mount Lemmon Survey || — || align=right | 3.2 km || 
|-id=233 bgcolor=#d6d6d6
| 488233 ||  || — || April 25, 2012 || Mount Lemmon || Mount Lemmon Survey || — || align=right | 4.0 km || 
|-id=234 bgcolor=#d6d6d6
| 488234 ||  || — || October 1, 2014 || Haleakala || Pan-STARRS || EOS || align=right | 2.0 km || 
|-id=235 bgcolor=#C2FFFF
| 488235 ||  || — || February 2, 2005 || Kitt Peak || Spacewatch || L5 || align=right | 9.9 km || 
|-id=236 bgcolor=#E9E9E9
| 488236 ||  || — || October 5, 1997 || Kitt Peak || Spacewatch || — || align=right | 1.1 km || 
|-id=237 bgcolor=#E9E9E9
| 488237 ||  || — || November 1, 2005 || Mount Lemmon || Mount Lemmon Survey || — || align=right | 2.2 km || 
|-id=238 bgcolor=#d6d6d6
| 488238 ||  || — || June 21, 2007 || Mount Lemmon || Mount Lemmon Survey || — || align=right | 3.7 km || 
|-id=239 bgcolor=#d6d6d6
| 488239 ||  || — || September 7, 2008 || Mount Lemmon || Mount Lemmon Survey || — || align=right | 3.5 km || 
|-id=240 bgcolor=#d6d6d6
| 488240 ||  || — || October 23, 2009 || La Sagra || OAM Obs. || — || align=right | 4.4 km || 
|-id=241 bgcolor=#E9E9E9
| 488241 ||  || — || November 26, 2011 || Haleakala || Pan-STARRS || MAR || align=right | 1.2 km || 
|-id=242 bgcolor=#d6d6d6
| 488242 ||  || — || December 19, 2009 || Kitt Peak || Spacewatch || — || align=right | 4.1 km || 
|-id=243 bgcolor=#C2FFFF
| 488243 ||  || — || February 4, 2005 || Mount Lemmon || Mount Lemmon Survey || L5 || align=right | 11 km || 
|-id=244 bgcolor=#d6d6d6
| 488244 ||  || — || March 5, 2010 || WISE || WISE || — || align=right | 3.4 km || 
|-id=245 bgcolor=#E9E9E9
| 488245 ||  || — || May 4, 2000 || Kitt Peak || Spacewatch || — || align=right | 1.9 km || 
|-id=246 bgcolor=#d6d6d6
| 488246 ||  || — || March 4, 2005 || Kitt Peak || Spacewatch || — || align=right | 3.2 km || 
|-id=247 bgcolor=#E9E9E9
| 488247 ||  || — || March 11, 2008 || Mount Lemmon || Mount Lemmon Survey || — || align=right | 1.8 km || 
|-id=248 bgcolor=#d6d6d6
| 488248 ||  || — || January 26, 2011 || Mount Lemmon || Mount Lemmon Survey || EOS || align=right | 2.2 km || 
|-id=249 bgcolor=#E9E9E9
| 488249 ||  || — || November 12, 2010 || Mount Lemmon || Mount Lemmon Survey || — || align=right | 2.0 km || 
|-id=250 bgcolor=#d6d6d6
| 488250 ||  || — || November 9, 2009 || Kitt Peak || Spacewatch || — || align=right | 3.7 km || 
|-id=251 bgcolor=#E9E9E9
| 488251 ||  || — || February 28, 2012 || Haleakala || Pan-STARRS || — || align=right | 2.2 km || 
|-id=252 bgcolor=#d6d6d6
| 488252 ||  || — || September 24, 2008 || Mount Lemmon || Mount Lemmon Survey || — || align=right | 2.8 km || 
|-id=253 bgcolor=#E9E9E9
| 488253 ||  || — || December 7, 2005 || Kitt Peak || Spacewatch || — || align=right | 2.2 km || 
|-id=254 bgcolor=#d6d6d6
| 488254 ||  || — || April 18, 2012 || Kitt Peak || Spacewatch || — || align=right | 3.8 km || 
|-id=255 bgcolor=#d6d6d6
| 488255 ||  || — || February 1, 2006 || Kitt Peak || Spacewatch || EOS || align=right | 1.9 km || 
|-id=256 bgcolor=#d6d6d6
| 488256 ||  || — || March 9, 2005 || Mount Lemmon || Mount Lemmon Survey || — || align=right | 3.2 km || 
|-id=257 bgcolor=#d6d6d6
| 488257 ||  || — || March 25, 2011 || Kitt Peak || Spacewatch || — || align=right | 2.8 km || 
|-id=258 bgcolor=#d6d6d6
| 488258 ||  || — || March 2, 2006 || Kitt Peak || Spacewatch || — || align=right | 2.8 km || 
|-id=259 bgcolor=#E9E9E9
| 488259 ||  || — || February 13, 2013 || Haleakala || Pan-STARRS || — || align=right | 1.7 km || 
|-id=260 bgcolor=#fefefe
| 488260 ||  || — || December 31, 2011 || Kitt Peak || Spacewatch || — || align=right data-sort-value="0.66" | 660 m || 
|-id=261 bgcolor=#d6d6d6
| 488261 ||  || — || July 2, 2011 || Mount Lemmon || Mount Lemmon Survey || — || align=right | 3.3 km || 
|-id=262 bgcolor=#fefefe
| 488262 ||  || — || June 20, 2013 || Haleakala || Pan-STARRS || H || align=right data-sort-value="0.73" | 730 m || 
|-id=263 bgcolor=#E9E9E9
| 488263 ||  || — || June 5, 2011 || Mount Lemmon || Mount Lemmon Survey || — || align=right | 1.4 km || 
|-id=264 bgcolor=#fefefe
| 488264 ||  || — || June 13, 2005 || Mount Lemmon || Mount Lemmon Survey || NYS || align=right data-sort-value="0.59" | 590 m || 
|-id=265 bgcolor=#fefefe
| 488265 ||  || — || December 7, 2005 || Kitt Peak || Spacewatch || — || align=right data-sort-value="0.95" | 950 m || 
|-id=266 bgcolor=#E9E9E9
| 488266 ||  || — || September 3, 2007 || Mount Lemmon || Mount Lemmon Survey || — || align=right | 2.3 km || 
|-id=267 bgcolor=#FA8072
| 488267 ||  || — || March 4, 2005 || Kitt Peak || Spacewatch || — || align=right data-sort-value="0.95" | 950 m || 
|-id=268 bgcolor=#d6d6d6
| 488268 ||  || — || November 12, 2005 || Catalina || CSS || — || align=right | 3.1 km || 
|-id=269 bgcolor=#E9E9E9
| 488269 ||  || — || February 26, 2014 || Haleakala || Pan-STARRS || EUN || align=right | 1.2 km || 
|-id=270 bgcolor=#fefefe
| 488270 ||  || — || October 1, 2005 || Anderson Mesa || LONEOS || — || align=right | 1.1 km || 
|-id=271 bgcolor=#E9E9E9
| 488271 ||  || — || November 28, 1999 || Kitt Peak || Spacewatch || — || align=right | 1.5 km || 
|-id=272 bgcolor=#E9E9E9
| 488272 ||  || — || July 22, 1995 || Kitt Peak || Spacewatch || EUN || align=right | 1.3 km || 
|-id=273 bgcolor=#fefefe
| 488273 ||  || — || September 5, 2008 || Kitt Peak || Spacewatch || — || align=right data-sort-value="0.77" | 770 m || 
|-id=274 bgcolor=#fefefe
| 488274 ||  || — || December 24, 2005 || Kitt Peak || Spacewatch || MAS || align=right data-sort-value="0.79" | 790 m || 
|-id=275 bgcolor=#E9E9E9
| 488275 ||  || — || January 2, 2009 || Mount Lemmon || Mount Lemmon Survey || — || align=right | 1.3 km || 
|-id=276 bgcolor=#E9E9E9
| 488276 ||  || — || October 19, 2003 || Kitt Peak || Spacewatch || — || align=right | 1.9 km || 
|-id=277 bgcolor=#fefefe
| 488277 ||  || — || October 22, 2009 || Catalina || CSS || — || align=right data-sort-value="0.81" | 810 m || 
|-id=278 bgcolor=#FA8072
| 488278 ||  || — || October 15, 2012 || Siding Spring || SSS || — || align=right data-sort-value="0.94" | 940 m || 
|-id=279 bgcolor=#fefefe
| 488279 ||  || — || February 28, 2014 || Haleakala || Pan-STARRS || — || align=right data-sort-value="0.73" | 730 m || 
|-id=280 bgcolor=#E9E9E9
| 488280 ||  || — || October 10, 2007 || Mount Lemmon || Mount Lemmon Survey || WIT || align=right | 1.1 km || 
|-id=281 bgcolor=#E9E9E9
| 488281 ||  || — || October 25, 2008 || Mount Lemmon || Mount Lemmon Survey || — || align=right | 1.4 km || 
|-id=282 bgcolor=#fefefe
| 488282 ||  || — || September 4, 2008 || Kitt Peak || Spacewatch || — || align=right data-sort-value="0.85" | 850 m || 
|-id=283 bgcolor=#d6d6d6
| 488283 ||  || — || September 24, 2000 || Socorro || LINEAR || — || align=right | 2.8 km || 
|-id=284 bgcolor=#fefefe
| 488284 ||  || — || September 27, 2003 || Kitt Peak || Spacewatch || — || align=right data-sort-value="0.57" | 570 m || 
|-id=285 bgcolor=#fefefe
| 488285 ||  || — || October 20, 2006 || Mount Lemmon || Mount Lemmon Survey || — || align=right data-sort-value="0.68" | 680 m || 
|-id=286 bgcolor=#E9E9E9
| 488286 ||  || — || September 15, 2007 || Catalina || CSS || — || align=right | 3.3 km || 
|-id=287 bgcolor=#E9E9E9
| 488287 ||  || — || September 21, 2011 || Haleakala || Pan-STARRS || HOF || align=right | 2.5 km || 
|-id=288 bgcolor=#E9E9E9
| 488288 ||  || — || December 13, 1999 || Kitt Peak || Spacewatch || — || align=right | 1.2 km || 
|-id=289 bgcolor=#d6d6d6
| 488289 ||  || — || October 26, 1994 || Kitt Peak || Spacewatch || THM || align=right | 2.0 km || 
|-id=290 bgcolor=#d6d6d6
| 488290 ||  || — || November 10, 1999 || Kitt Peak || Spacewatch || — || align=right | 2.5 km || 
|-id=291 bgcolor=#E9E9E9
| 488291 ||  || — || September 28, 2008 || Mount Lemmon || Mount Lemmon Survey || — || align=right | 1.2 km || 
|-id=292 bgcolor=#E9E9E9
| 488292 ||  || — || November 7, 2008 || Mount Lemmon || Mount Lemmon Survey || (5) || align=right data-sort-value="0.83" | 830 m || 
|-id=293 bgcolor=#d6d6d6
| 488293 ||  || — || November 23, 1995 || Kitt Peak || Spacewatch || — || align=right | 2.9 km || 
|-id=294 bgcolor=#fefefe
| 488294 ||  || — || April 27, 2001 || Kitt Peak || Spacewatch || — || align=right | 1.0 km || 
|-id=295 bgcolor=#E9E9E9
| 488295 ||  || — || January 13, 2005 || Kitt Peak || Spacewatch || (5) || align=right | 1.0 km || 
|-id=296 bgcolor=#E9E9E9
| 488296 ||  || — || March 26, 2010 || Kitt Peak || Spacewatch || MAR || align=right | 1.3 km || 
|-id=297 bgcolor=#d6d6d6
| 488297 ||  || — || September 19, 2001 || Socorro || LINEAR || KOR || align=right | 2.1 km || 
|-id=298 bgcolor=#E9E9E9
| 488298 ||  || — || December 31, 2008 || Mount Lemmon || Mount Lemmon Survey || MAR || align=right | 1.3 km || 
|-id=299 bgcolor=#E9E9E9
| 488299 ||  || — || September 13, 2007 || Mount Lemmon || Mount Lemmon Survey || fast || align=right | 1.3 km || 
|-id=300 bgcolor=#fefefe
| 488300 ||  || — || September 14, 2005 || Kitt Peak || Spacewatch || — || align=right data-sort-value="0.83" | 830 m || 
|}

488301–488400 

|-bgcolor=#d6d6d6
| 488301 ||  || — || April 24, 2008 || Mount Lemmon || Mount Lemmon Survey || — || align=right | 3.0 km || 
|-id=302 bgcolor=#fefefe
| 488302 ||  || — || October 21, 2008 || Kitt Peak || Spacewatch || H || align=right data-sort-value="0.50" | 500 m || 
|-id=303 bgcolor=#E9E9E9
| 488303 ||  || — || March 8, 2005 || Mount Lemmon || Mount Lemmon Survey || — || align=right | 1.6 km || 
|-id=304 bgcolor=#E9E9E9
| 488304 ||  || — || November 15, 1999 || Socorro || LINEAR || — || align=right | 1.9 km || 
|-id=305 bgcolor=#E9E9E9
| 488305 ||  || — || December 1, 2008 || Mount Lemmon || Mount Lemmon Survey || — || align=right | 1.4 km || 
|-id=306 bgcolor=#E9E9E9
| 488306 ||  || — || April 25, 2006 || Kitt Peak || Spacewatch || fast? || align=right | 1.6 km || 
|-id=307 bgcolor=#d6d6d6
| 488307 ||  || — || March 4, 2008 || Kitt Peak || Spacewatch || — || align=right | 2.9 km || 
|-id=308 bgcolor=#E9E9E9
| 488308 ||  || — || July 18, 2007 || Mount Lemmon || Mount Lemmon Survey ||  || align=right | 1.4 km || 
|-id=309 bgcolor=#E9E9E9
| 488309 ||  || — || November 19, 2003 || Kitt Peak || Spacewatch || — || align=right | 1.8 km || 
|-id=310 bgcolor=#fefefe
| 488310 ||  || — || November 8, 2009 || Mount Lemmon || Mount Lemmon Survey || V || align=right data-sort-value="0.60" | 600 m || 
|-id=311 bgcolor=#E9E9E9
| 488311 ||  || — || September 24, 2011 || Mount Lemmon || Mount Lemmon Survey || AST || align=right | 1.8 km || 
|-id=312 bgcolor=#E9E9E9
| 488312 ||  || — || September 13, 2007 || Kitt Peak || Spacewatch || — || align=right | 1.6 km || 
|-id=313 bgcolor=#fefefe
| 488313 ||  || — || February 2, 2005 || Kitt Peak || Spacewatch || — || align=right data-sort-value="0.84" | 840 m || 
|-id=314 bgcolor=#d6d6d6
| 488314 ||  || — || October 22, 2006 || Mount Lemmon || Mount Lemmon Survey || — || align=right | 2.2 km || 
|-id=315 bgcolor=#d6d6d6
| 488315 ||  || — || June 25, 2010 || WISE || WISE || THB || align=right | 2.9 km || 
|-id=316 bgcolor=#fefefe
| 488316 ||  || — || March 29, 2007 || Kitt Peak || Spacewatch || — || align=right data-sort-value="0.87" | 870 m || 
|-id=317 bgcolor=#d6d6d6
| 488317 ||  || — || August 8, 2004 || Siding Spring || SSS || — || align=right | 3.2 km || 
|-id=318 bgcolor=#fefefe
| 488318 ||  || — || October 22, 2005 || Kitt Peak || Spacewatch || — || align=right data-sort-value="0.71" | 710 m || 
|-id=319 bgcolor=#E9E9E9
| 488319 ||  || — || October 20, 2003 || Kitt Peak || Spacewatch || — || align=right | 1.5 km || 
|-id=320 bgcolor=#E9E9E9
| 488320 ||  || — || October 16, 2007 || Mount Lemmon || Mount Lemmon Survey || — || align=right | 1.4 km || 
|-id=321 bgcolor=#E9E9E9
| 488321 ||  || — || September 28, 2003 || Anderson Mesa || LONEOS || (1547) || align=right | 1.6 km || 
|-id=322 bgcolor=#fefefe
| 488322 ||  || — || April 9, 2010 || Mount Lemmon || Mount Lemmon Survey || H || align=right data-sort-value="0.65" | 650 m || 
|-id=323 bgcolor=#d6d6d6
| 488323 ||  || — || October 2, 2003 || Kitt Peak || Spacewatch || 7:4 || align=right | 3.2 km || 
|-id=324 bgcolor=#E9E9E9
| 488324 ||  || — || September 13, 2007 || Catalina || CSS || JUN || align=right | 1.2 km || 
|-id=325 bgcolor=#E9E9E9
| 488325 ||  || — || April 30, 2006 || Kitt Peak || Spacewatch || — || align=right | 1.9 km || 
|-id=326 bgcolor=#E9E9E9
| 488326 ||  || — || October 19, 2012 || Catalina || CSS || — || align=right | 1.3 km || 
|-id=327 bgcolor=#d6d6d6
| 488327 ||  || — || January 9, 2002 || Socorro || LINEAR || — || align=right | 3.3 km || 
|-id=328 bgcolor=#d6d6d6
| 488328 ||  || — || September 29, 2005 || Catalina || CSS || EOS || align=right | 2.2 km || 
|-id=329 bgcolor=#d6d6d6
| 488329 ||  || — || November 20, 2000 || Socorro || LINEAR || — || align=right | 2.3 km || 
|-id=330 bgcolor=#E9E9E9
| 488330 ||  || — || October 10, 2012 || Haleakala || Pan-STARRS || — || align=right | 1.2 km || 
|-id=331 bgcolor=#d6d6d6
| 488331 ||  || — || November 21, 2005 || Catalina || CSS || — || align=right | 2.6 km || 
|-id=332 bgcolor=#FA8072
| 488332 ||  || — || December 18, 2004 || Socorro || LINEAR || H || align=right data-sort-value="0.62" | 620 m || 
|-id=333 bgcolor=#E9E9E9
| 488333 ||  || — || October 13, 2012 || Haleakala || Pan-STARRS || EUN || align=right | 1.4 km || 
|-id=334 bgcolor=#d6d6d6
| 488334 ||  || — || September 8, 2005 || Siding Spring || SSS || — || align=right | 2.9 km || 
|-id=335 bgcolor=#d6d6d6
| 488335 ||  || — || January 28, 2007 || Kitt Peak || Spacewatch || — || align=right | 2.2 km || 
|-id=336 bgcolor=#fefefe
| 488336 ||  || — || September 21, 2012 || Catalina || CSS || — || align=right data-sort-value="0.94" | 940 m || 
|-id=337 bgcolor=#E9E9E9
| 488337 ||  || — || October 11, 2007 || Catalina || CSS || — || align=right | 1.6 km || 
|-id=338 bgcolor=#E9E9E9
| 488338 ||  || — || May 7, 2014 || Haleakala || Pan-STARRS || — || align=right | 1.3 km || 
|-id=339 bgcolor=#fefefe
| 488339 ||  || — || January 3, 2003 || Kitt Peak || Spacewatch || — || align=right data-sort-value="0.96" | 960 m || 
|-id=340 bgcolor=#d6d6d6
| 488340 ||  || — || December 19, 2011 || XuYi || PMO NEO || — || align=right | 2.7 km || 
|-id=341 bgcolor=#E9E9E9
| 488341 ||  || — || January 1, 2009 || Mount Lemmon || Mount Lemmon Survey || — || align=right data-sort-value="0.94" | 940 m || 
|-id=342 bgcolor=#E9E9E9
| 488342 ||  || — || February 28, 2014 || Haleakala || Pan-STARRS || — || align=right | 2.2 km || 
|-id=343 bgcolor=#E9E9E9
| 488343 ||  || — || February 27, 2006 || Kitt Peak || Spacewatch || EUN || align=right | 1.5 km || 
|-id=344 bgcolor=#E9E9E9
| 488344 ||  || — || February 3, 2009 || Mount Lemmon || Mount Lemmon Survey || — || align=right | 2.1 km || 
|-id=345 bgcolor=#d6d6d6
| 488345 ||  || — || April 4, 2014 || Haleakala || Pan-STARRS || EOS || align=right | 2.3 km || 
|-id=346 bgcolor=#d6d6d6
| 488346 ||  || — || November 16, 2011 || Kitt Peak || Spacewatch || — || align=right | 3.4 km || 
|-id=347 bgcolor=#fefefe
| 488347 ||  || — || October 22, 2009 || Mount Lemmon || Mount Lemmon Survey || — || align=right data-sort-value="0.77" | 770 m || 
|-id=348 bgcolor=#d6d6d6
| 488348 ||  || — || December 2, 2005 || Mount Lemmon || Mount Lemmon Survey || — || align=right | 3.7 km || 
|-id=349 bgcolor=#fefefe
| 488349 ||  || — || September 14, 2012 || Catalina || CSS || — || align=right data-sort-value="0.77" | 770 m || 
|-id=350 bgcolor=#d6d6d6
| 488350 ||  || — || April 12, 2004 || Kitt Peak || Spacewatch || — || align=right | 2.7 km || 
|-id=351 bgcolor=#d6d6d6
| 488351 ||  || — || September 29, 2005 || Kitt Peak || Spacewatch || EOS || align=right | 2.1 km || 
|-id=352 bgcolor=#d6d6d6
| 488352 ||  || — || September 22, 2009 || Catalina || CSS || ULA7:4 || align=right | 5.4 km || 
|-id=353 bgcolor=#fefefe
| 488353 ||  || — || September 18, 2003 || Kitt Peak || Spacewatch || — || align=right data-sort-value="0.57" | 570 m || 
|-id=354 bgcolor=#E9E9E9
| 488354 ||  || — || November 7, 2007 || Catalina || CSS || — || align=right | 1.7 km || 
|-id=355 bgcolor=#fefefe
| 488355 ||  || — || December 9, 2001 || Socorro || LINEAR || — || align=right | 1.1 km || 
|-id=356 bgcolor=#fefefe
| 488356 ||  || — || December 26, 2006 || Kitt Peak || Spacewatch || — || align=right data-sort-value="0.87" | 870 m || 
|-id=357 bgcolor=#fefefe
| 488357 ||  || — || March 4, 2008 || Catalina || CSS || — || align=right data-sort-value="0.90" | 900 m || 
|-id=358 bgcolor=#E9E9E9
| 488358 ||  || — || January 15, 2005 || Kitt Peak || Spacewatch || (5) || align=right data-sort-value="0.88" | 880 m || 
|-id=359 bgcolor=#E9E9E9
| 488359 ||  || — || December 11, 2012 || Mount Lemmon || Mount Lemmon Survey || — || align=right | 1.2 km || 
|-id=360 bgcolor=#d6d6d6
| 488360 ||  || — || January 19, 2012 || Catalina || CSS || — || align=right | 3.1 km || 
|-id=361 bgcolor=#d6d6d6
| 488361 ||  || — || April 14, 2007 || Mount Lemmon || Mount Lemmon Survey || — || align=right | 3.7 km || 
|-id=362 bgcolor=#fefefe
| 488362 ||  || — || July 29, 2008 || Mount Lemmon || Mount Lemmon Survey || — || align=right data-sort-value="0.97" | 970 m || 
|-id=363 bgcolor=#E9E9E9
| 488363 ||  || — || January 15, 2005 || Kitt Peak || Spacewatch || — || align=right | 2.8 km || 
|-id=364 bgcolor=#d6d6d6
| 488364 ||  || — || March 10, 2007 || Kitt Peak || Spacewatch || — || align=right | 3.0 km || 
|-id=365 bgcolor=#d6d6d6
| 488365 ||  || — || October 23, 2011 || Haleakala || Pan-STARRS || — || align=right | 3.1 km || 
|-id=366 bgcolor=#E9E9E9
| 488366 ||  || — || October 10, 2007 || Kitt Peak || Spacewatch || — || align=right | 1.4 km || 
|-id=367 bgcolor=#E9E9E9
| 488367 ||  || — || February 6, 2013 || Catalina || CSS || — || align=right | 2.5 km || 
|-id=368 bgcolor=#d6d6d6
| 488368 ||  || — || December 7, 2005 || Kitt Peak || Spacewatch || — || align=right | 4.5 km || 
|-id=369 bgcolor=#d6d6d6
| 488369 ||  || — || October 23, 2004 || Kitt Peak || Spacewatch || — || align=right | 3.0 km || 
|-id=370 bgcolor=#E9E9E9
| 488370 ||  || — || November 5, 2012 || Kitt Peak || Spacewatch || — || align=right | 1.2 km || 
|-id=371 bgcolor=#d6d6d6
| 488371 ||  || — || November 11, 2004 || Catalina || CSS || — || align=right | 4.5 km || 
|-id=372 bgcolor=#E9E9E9
| 488372 ||  || — || January 16, 2005 || Kitt Peak || Spacewatch || — || align=right | 1.2 km || 
|-id=373 bgcolor=#d6d6d6
| 488373 ||  || — || September 30, 2005 || Anderson Mesa || LONEOS || EOS || align=right | 2.6 km || 
|-id=374 bgcolor=#d6d6d6
| 488374 ||  || — || January 7, 2006 || Mount Lemmon || Mount Lemmon Survey || — || align=right | 4.3 km || 
|-id=375 bgcolor=#d6d6d6
| 488375 ||  || — || November 22, 2005 || Kitt Peak || Spacewatch || — || align=right | 3.5 km || 
|-id=376 bgcolor=#E9E9E9
| 488376 ||  || — || December 14, 2004 || Kitt Peak || Spacewatch || — || align=right | 1.1 km || 
|-id=377 bgcolor=#fefefe
| 488377 ||  || — || April 8, 2010 || Siding Spring || SSS || — || align=right | 4.0 km || 
|-id=378 bgcolor=#d6d6d6
| 488378 ||  || — || October 8, 2005 || Kitt Peak || Spacewatch || — || align=right | 2.9 km || 
|-id=379 bgcolor=#fefefe
| 488379 ||  || — || April 23, 2007 || Mount Lemmon || Mount Lemmon Survey || H || align=right data-sort-value="0.63" | 630 m || 
|-id=380 bgcolor=#d6d6d6
| 488380 ||  || — || October 9, 2004 || Kitt Peak || Spacewatch || — || align=right | 3.2 km || 
|-id=381 bgcolor=#d6d6d6
| 488381 ||  || — || December 5, 1999 || Catalina || CSS || THB || align=right | 4.1 km || 
|-id=382 bgcolor=#fefefe
| 488382 ||  || — || May 14, 2004 || Kitt Peak || Spacewatch || H || align=right data-sort-value="0.76" | 760 m || 
|-id=383 bgcolor=#fefefe
| 488383 ||  || — || October 18, 2012 || Haleakala || Pan-STARRS || — || align=right data-sort-value="0.86" | 860 m || 
|-id=384 bgcolor=#d6d6d6
| 488384 ||  || — || November 1, 2010 || Mount Lemmon || Mount Lemmon Survey || — || align=right | 3.0 km || 
|-id=385 bgcolor=#fefefe
| 488385 ||  || — || October 22, 2005 || Kitt Peak || Spacewatch || — || align=right data-sort-value="0.72" | 720 m || 
|-id=386 bgcolor=#d6d6d6
| 488386 ||  || — || May 8, 2008 || Kitt Peak || Spacewatch || — || align=right | 4.1 km || 
|-id=387 bgcolor=#d6d6d6
| 488387 ||  || — || October 12, 1999 || Socorro || LINEAR || — || align=right | 2.8 km || 
|-id=388 bgcolor=#d6d6d6
| 488388 ||  || — || November 17, 2006 || Kitt Peak || Spacewatch || TEL || align=right | 2.0 km || 
|-id=389 bgcolor=#d6d6d6
| 488389 ||  || — || January 2, 2012 || Kitt Peak || Spacewatch || — || align=right | 2.0 km || 
|-id=390 bgcolor=#fefefe
| 488390 ||  || — || December 5, 2005 || Anderson Mesa || LONEOS || H || align=right data-sort-value="0.54" | 540 m || 
|-id=391 bgcolor=#d6d6d6
| 488391 ||  || — || December 2, 2004 || Catalina || CSS || — || align=right | 4.3 km || 
|-id=392 bgcolor=#fefefe
| 488392 ||  || — || November 3, 2005 || Catalina || CSS || — || align=right | 1.0 km || 
|-id=393 bgcolor=#E9E9E9
| 488393 ||  || — || November 6, 2012 || Kitt Peak || Spacewatch || MAR || align=right | 1.2 km || 
|-id=394 bgcolor=#d6d6d6
| 488394 ||  || — || October 19, 2011 || Haleakala || Pan-STARRS || — || align=right | 2.2 km || 
|-id=395 bgcolor=#d6d6d6
| 488395 ||  || — || March 6, 2008 || Mount Lemmon || Mount Lemmon Survey || EOS || align=right | 2.1 km || 
|-id=396 bgcolor=#E9E9E9
| 488396 ||  || — || June 18, 2015 || Haleakala || Pan-STARRS || — || align=right | 1.9 km || 
|-id=397 bgcolor=#fefefe
| 488397 ||  || — || October 2, 2013 || Catalina || CSS || — || align=right data-sort-value="0.78" | 780 m || 
|-id=398 bgcolor=#d6d6d6
| 488398 ||  || — || November 22, 2006 || Mount Lemmon || Mount Lemmon Survey || — || align=right | 3.3 km || 
|-id=399 bgcolor=#E9E9E9
| 488399 ||  || — || September 12, 2007 || Mount Lemmon || Mount Lemmon Survey || MIS || align=right | 2.1 km || 
|-id=400 bgcolor=#fefefe
| 488400 ||  || — || September 30, 2005 || Mount Lemmon || Mount Lemmon Survey || — || align=right data-sort-value="0.87" | 870 m || 
|}

488401–488500 

|-bgcolor=#E9E9E9
| 488401 ||  || — || June 17, 2010 || WISE || WISE || — || align=right | 3.2 km || 
|-id=402 bgcolor=#d6d6d6
| 488402 ||  || — || September 15, 2004 || Kitt Peak || Spacewatch || — || align=right | 3.2 km || 
|-id=403 bgcolor=#E9E9E9
| 488403 ||  || — || December 12, 2004 || Campo Imperatore || CINEOS || — || align=right | 1.0 km || 
|-id=404 bgcolor=#E9E9E9
| 488404 ||  || — || December 3, 2012 || Mount Lemmon || Mount Lemmon Survey || (5) || align=right data-sort-value="0.89" | 890 m || 
|-id=405 bgcolor=#fefefe
| 488405 ||  || — || January 29, 2007 || Kitt Peak || Spacewatch || — || align=right data-sort-value="0.78" | 780 m || 
|-id=406 bgcolor=#d6d6d6
| 488406 ||  || — || July 4, 2005 || Kitt Peak || Spacewatch || — || align=right | 3.1 km || 
|-id=407 bgcolor=#fefefe
| 488407 ||  || — || December 1, 2005 || Kitt Peak || Spacewatch || NYS || align=right data-sort-value="0.61" | 610 m || 
|-id=408 bgcolor=#fefefe
| 488408 ||  || — || January 28, 2006 || Kitt Peak || Spacewatch || — || align=right data-sort-value="0.77" | 770 m || 
|-id=409 bgcolor=#E9E9E9
| 488409 ||  || — || November 7, 2007 || Catalina || CSS || — || align=right | 1.8 km || 
|-id=410 bgcolor=#fefefe
| 488410 ||  || — || January 5, 2006 || Catalina || CSS || — || align=right data-sort-value="0.83" | 830 m || 
|-id=411 bgcolor=#d6d6d6
| 488411 ||  || — || December 21, 2006 || Kitt Peak || Spacewatch || — || align=right | 2.8 km || 
|-id=412 bgcolor=#fefefe
| 488412 ||  || — || August 31, 2013 || Haleakala || Pan-STARRS || H || align=right data-sort-value="0.55" | 550 m || 
|-id=413 bgcolor=#fefefe
| 488413 ||  || — || September 18, 2012 || Mount Lemmon || Mount Lemmon Survey || V || align=right data-sort-value="0.63" | 630 m || 
|-id=414 bgcolor=#d6d6d6
| 488414 ||  || — || April 28, 2008 || Mount Lemmon || Mount Lemmon Survey || — || align=right | 2.7 km || 
|-id=415 bgcolor=#d6d6d6
| 488415 ||  || — || November 3, 2005 || Kitt Peak || Spacewatch || — || align=right | 2.5 km || 
|-id=416 bgcolor=#fefefe
| 488416 ||  || — || September 24, 2012 || Mount Lemmon || Mount Lemmon Survey || — || align=right data-sort-value="0.88" | 880 m || 
|-id=417 bgcolor=#fefefe
| 488417 ||  || — || October 11, 1999 || Socorro || LINEAR || — || align=right data-sort-value="0.62" | 620 m || 
|-id=418 bgcolor=#E9E9E9
| 488418 ||  || — || May 9, 2010 || Siding Spring || SSS || MAR || align=right | 1.4 km || 
|-id=419 bgcolor=#d6d6d6
| 488419 ||  || — || August 9, 2004 || Campo Imperatore || CINEOS || — || align=right | 4.0 km || 
|-id=420 bgcolor=#fefefe
| 488420 ||  || — || October 27, 2009 || Mount Lemmon || Mount Lemmon Survey || — || align=right data-sort-value="0.70" | 700 m || 
|-id=421 bgcolor=#E9E9E9
| 488421 ||  || — || January 7, 2005 || Campo Imperatore || CINEOS || — || align=right | 1.0 km || 
|-id=422 bgcolor=#fefefe
| 488422 ||  || — || February 21, 2007 || Mount Lemmon || Mount Lemmon Survey || — || align=right data-sort-value="0.94" | 940 m || 
|-id=423 bgcolor=#E9E9E9
| 488423 ||  || — || September 9, 2007 || Kitt Peak || Spacewatch || — || align=right | 1.5 km || 
|-id=424 bgcolor=#E9E9E9
| 488424 ||  || — || March 15, 2007 || Mount Lemmon || Mount Lemmon Survey || — || align=right | 1.3 km || 
|-id=425 bgcolor=#fefefe
| 488425 ||  || — || January 28, 2007 || Mount Lemmon || Mount Lemmon Survey || critical || align=right data-sort-value="0.47" | 470 m || 
|-id=426 bgcolor=#d6d6d6
| 488426 ||  || — || February 1, 2012 || Mount Lemmon || Mount Lemmon Survey || VER || align=right | 2.5 km || 
|-id=427 bgcolor=#d6d6d6
| 488427 ||  || — || October 1, 2008 || Mount Lemmon || Mount Lemmon Survey || 3:2 || align=right | 4.3 km || 
|-id=428 bgcolor=#fefefe
| 488428 ||  || — || September 13, 2005 || Kitt Peak || Spacewatch || — || align=right data-sort-value="0.65" | 650 m || 
|-id=429 bgcolor=#d6d6d6
| 488429 ||  || — || June 10, 2010 || WISE || WISE || — || align=right | 3.7 km || 
|-id=430 bgcolor=#d6d6d6
| 488430 ||  || — || December 2, 2010 || Kitt Peak || Spacewatch || — || align=right | 3.0 km || 
|-id=431 bgcolor=#d6d6d6
| 488431 ||  || — || December 6, 2010 || Kitt Peak || Spacewatch || — || align=right | 4.4 km || 
|-id=432 bgcolor=#fefefe
| 488432 ||  || — || November 17, 2001 || Socorro || LINEAR || — || align=right | 1.3 km || 
|-id=433 bgcolor=#E9E9E9
| 488433 ||  || — || September 5, 2007 || Catalina || CSS || — || align=right | 1.6 km || 
|-id=434 bgcolor=#d6d6d6
| 488434 ||  || — || October 16, 2010 || Siding Spring || SSS || Tj (2.98) || align=right | 3.3 km || 
|-id=435 bgcolor=#E9E9E9
| 488435 ||  || — || December 4, 2012 || Catalina || CSS || — || align=right | 1.1 km || 
|-id=436 bgcolor=#E9E9E9
| 488436 ||  || — || September 2, 2007 || Mount Lemmon || Mount Lemmon Survey || — || align=right | 1.7 km || 
|-id=437 bgcolor=#E9E9E9
| 488437 ||  || — || January 10, 2008 || Mount Lemmon || Mount Lemmon Survey || — || align=right | 2.0 km || 
|-id=438 bgcolor=#E9E9E9
| 488438 ||  || — || October 1, 2011 || Kitt Peak || Spacewatch || — || align=right | 2.0 km || 
|-id=439 bgcolor=#E9E9E9
| 488439 ||  || — || December 7, 2004 || Socorro || LINEAR || — || align=right | 1.5 km || 
|-id=440 bgcolor=#E9E9E9
| 488440 ||  || — || April 24, 2014 || Kitt Peak || Spacewatch || — || align=right | 1.3 km || 
|-id=441 bgcolor=#E9E9E9
| 488441 ||  || — || December 28, 2007 || Socorro || LINEAR || — || align=right | 3.5 km || 
|-id=442 bgcolor=#d6d6d6
| 488442 ||  || — || May 5, 2008 || Kitt Peak || Spacewatch || — || align=right | 3.4 km || 
|-id=443 bgcolor=#E9E9E9
| 488443 ||  || — || January 16, 2008 || Kitt Peak || Spacewatch || — || align=right | 2.8 km || 
|-id=444 bgcolor=#fefefe
| 488444 ||  || — || December 21, 2006 || Mount Lemmon || Mount Lemmon Survey || H || align=right data-sort-value="0.54" | 540 m || 
|-id=445 bgcolor=#E9E9E9
| 488445 ||  || — || February 4, 2005 || Catalina || CSS || — || align=right | 1.1 km || 
|-id=446 bgcolor=#d6d6d6
| 488446 ||  || — || June 20, 2010 || WISE || WISE || — || align=right | 3.2 km || 
|-id=447 bgcolor=#fefefe
| 488447 ||  || — || September 29, 2005 || Mount Lemmon || Mount Lemmon Survey || — || align=right data-sort-value="0.81" | 810 m || 
|-id=448 bgcolor=#fefefe
| 488448 ||  || — || August 26, 2012 || Haleakala || Pan-STARRS || — || align=right data-sort-value="0.85" | 850 m || 
|-id=449 bgcolor=#d6d6d6
| 488449 ||  || — || October 2, 2009 || Mount Lemmon || Mount Lemmon Survey || — || align=right | 4.2 km || 
|-id=450 bgcolor=#FFC2E0
| 488450 ||  || — || May 14, 1994 || Palomar || C. S. Shoemaker || AMO +1km || align=right | 1.4 km || 
|-id=451 bgcolor=#d6d6d6
| 488451 ||  || — || September 29, 1994 || Kitt Peak || Spacewatch || THM || align=right | 2.0 km || 
|-id=452 bgcolor=#E9E9E9
| 488452 ||  || — || November 5, 1994 || Kitt Peak || Spacewatch || (5) || align=right data-sort-value="0.85" | 850 m || 
|-id=453 bgcolor=#FFC2E0
| 488453 ||  || — || December 1, 1994 || Kitt Peak || Spacewatch || APOPHAmooncritical || align=right data-sort-value="0.54" | 540 m || 
|-id=454 bgcolor=#d6d6d6
| 488454 ||  || — || February 24, 1995 || Kitt Peak || Spacewatch || — || align=right | 2.2 km || 
|-id=455 bgcolor=#E9E9E9
| 488455 ||  || — || September 17, 1995 || Kitt Peak || Spacewatch || — || align=right | 1.6 km || 
|-id=456 bgcolor=#E9E9E9
| 488456 ||  || — || September 25, 1995 || Kitt Peak || Spacewatch || — || align=right data-sort-value="0.71" | 710 m || 
|-id=457 bgcolor=#E9E9E9
| 488457 ||  || — || October 1, 1995 || Kitt Peak || Spacewatch || — || align=right | 1.0 km || 
|-id=458 bgcolor=#d6d6d6
| 488458 ||  || — || October 18, 1995 || Kitt Peak || Spacewatch || EOS || align=right | 1.5 km || 
|-id=459 bgcolor=#fefefe
| 488459 ||  || — || October 16, 1995 || Kitt Peak || Spacewatch || — || align=right data-sort-value="0.82" | 820 m || 
|-id=460 bgcolor=#d6d6d6
| 488460 ||  || — || January 24, 1996 || Kitt Peak || Spacewatch || — || align=right | 2.5 km || 
|-id=461 bgcolor=#FFC2E0
| 488461 ||  || — || March 17, 1996 || Kitt Peak || Spacewatch || APOcritical || align=right data-sort-value="0.32" | 320 m || 
|-id=462 bgcolor=#FA8072
| 488462 ||  || — || October 5, 1996 || Kitt Peak || Spacewatch || — || align=right | 1.8 km || 
|-id=463 bgcolor=#d6d6d6
| 488463 ||  || — || November 9, 1996 || Kitt Peak || Spacewatch || — || align=right | 2.8 km || 
|-id=464 bgcolor=#d6d6d6
| 488464 ||  || — || September 23, 1997 || Kitt Peak || Spacewatch || EOS || align=right | 1.9 km || 
|-id=465 bgcolor=#FFC2E0
| 488465 ||  || — || April 18, 1998 || Socorro || LINEAR || AMO || align=right data-sort-value="0.43" | 430 m || 
|-id=466 bgcolor=#d6d6d6
| 488466 ||  || — || August 30, 1998 || Kitt Peak || Spacewatch || EOS || align=right | 1.8 km || 
|-id=467 bgcolor=#E9E9E9
| 488467 ||  || — || August 30, 1998 || Kitt Peak || Spacewatch || — || align=right | 1.8 km || 
|-id=468 bgcolor=#E9E9E9
| 488468 ||  || — || August 26, 1998 || Kitt Peak || Spacewatch || — || align=right | 1.4 km || 
|-id=469 bgcolor=#E9E9E9
| 488469 ||  || — || September 26, 1998 || Socorro || LINEAR || (5) || align=right | 1.2 km || 
|-id=470 bgcolor=#d6d6d6
| 488470 ||  || — || October 27, 1998 || Kitt Peak || Spacewatch || EOS || align=right | 1.7 km || 
|-id=471 bgcolor=#fefefe
| 488471 ||  || — || November 18, 1998 || Kitt Peak || Spacewatch || — || align=right data-sort-value="0.68" | 680 m || 
|-id=472 bgcolor=#fefefe
| 488472 ||  || — || December 22, 1998 || Kitt Peak || Spacewatch || — || align=right data-sort-value="0.63" | 630 m || 
|-id=473 bgcolor=#E9E9E9
| 488473 ||  || — || March 20, 1999 || Apache Point || SDSS || — || align=right | 1.8 km || 
|-id=474 bgcolor=#FFC2E0
| 488474 ||  || — || April 16, 1999 || Kitt Peak || Spacewatch || APO || align=right data-sort-value="0.31" | 310 m || 
|-id=475 bgcolor=#E9E9E9
| 488475 ||  || — || September 8, 1999 || Socorro || LINEAR || — || align=right | 2.9 km || 
|-id=476 bgcolor=#FA8072
| 488476 ||  || — || September 8, 1999 || Socorro || LINEAR || — || align=right data-sort-value="0.92" | 920 m || 
|-id=477 bgcolor=#E9E9E9
| 488477 ||  || — || October 7, 1999 || Goodricke-Pigott || R. A. Tucker || — || align=right | 1.9 km || 
|-id=478 bgcolor=#E9E9E9
| 488478 ||  || — || September 14, 1999 || Socorro || LINEAR || (1547) || align=right | 1.9 km || 
|-id=479 bgcolor=#d6d6d6
| 488479 ||  || — || October 3, 1999 || Kitt Peak || Spacewatch || — || align=right | 3.0 km || 
|-id=480 bgcolor=#fefefe
| 488480 ||  || — || October 3, 1999 || Kitt Peak || Spacewatch || H || align=right data-sort-value="0.73" | 730 m || 
|-id=481 bgcolor=#E9E9E9
| 488481 ||  || — || October 7, 1999 || Kitt Peak || Spacewatch || — || align=right | 1.5 km || 
|-id=482 bgcolor=#E9E9E9
| 488482 ||  || — || October 12, 1999 || Socorro || LINEAR || — || align=right | 1.4 km || 
|-id=483 bgcolor=#fefefe
| 488483 ||  || — || October 31, 1999 || Kitt Peak || Spacewatch || — || align=right data-sort-value="0.54" | 540 m || 
|-id=484 bgcolor=#E9E9E9
| 488484 ||  || — || October 19, 1999 || Kitt Peak || Spacewatch || — || align=right | 1.7 km || 
|-id=485 bgcolor=#fefefe
| 488485 ||  || — || October 19, 1999 || Kitt Peak || Spacewatch || — || align=right data-sort-value="0.73" | 730 m || 
|-id=486 bgcolor=#FFC2E0
| 488486 ||  || — || November 5, 1999 || Catalina || CSS || AMO || align=right data-sort-value="0.70" | 700 m || 
|-id=487 bgcolor=#fefefe
| 488487 ||  || — || October 14, 1999 || Socorro || LINEAR || H || align=right data-sort-value="0.83" | 830 m || 
|-id=488 bgcolor=#fefefe
| 488488 ||  || — || November 1, 1999 || Kitt Peak || Spacewatch || — || align=right data-sort-value="0.63" | 630 m || 
|-id=489 bgcolor=#fefefe
| 488489 ||  || — || November 15, 1999 || Socorro || LINEAR || H || align=right data-sort-value="0.80" | 800 m || 
|-id=490 bgcolor=#FFC2E0
| 488490 ||  || — || January 8, 2000 || Socorro || LINEAR || APOPHA || align=right data-sort-value="0.15" | 150 m || 
|-id=491 bgcolor=#d6d6d6
| 488491 ||  || — || February 3, 2000 || Kitt Peak || Spacewatch || THM || align=right | 1.9 km || 
|-id=492 bgcolor=#d6d6d6
| 488492 ||  || — || March 5, 2000 || Cerro Tololo || DLS || — || align=right | 2.2 km || 
|-id=493 bgcolor=#E9E9E9
| 488493 ||  || — || March 30, 2000 || Kitt Peak || Spacewatch || — || align=right | 1.6 km || 
|-id=494 bgcolor=#FFC2E0
| 488494 ||  || — || May 3, 2000 || Socorro || LINEAR || AMO || align=right data-sort-value="0.77" | 770 m || 
|-id=495 bgcolor=#d6d6d6
| 488495 ||  || — || May 29, 2000 || Kitt Peak || Spacewatch || — || align=right | 3.4 km || 
|-id=496 bgcolor=#d6d6d6
| 488496 ||  || — || July 24, 2000 || Kitt Peak || Spacewatch || — || align=right | 1.8 km || 
|-id=497 bgcolor=#E9E9E9
| 488497 ||  || — || August 24, 2000 || Socorro || LINEAR || — || align=right | 1.0 km || 
|-id=498 bgcolor=#FA8072
| 488498 ||  || — || August 28, 2000 || Socorro || LINEAR || — || align=right | 1.9 km || 
|-id=499 bgcolor=#fefefe
| 488499 ||  || — || August 31, 2000 || Socorro || LINEAR || — || align=right data-sort-value="0.82" | 820 m || 
|-id=500 bgcolor=#fefefe
| 488500 ||  || — || September 24, 2000 || Socorro || LINEAR || H || align=right data-sort-value="0.68" | 680 m || 
|}

488501–488600 

|-bgcolor=#E9E9E9
| 488501 ||  || — || September 24, 2000 || Socorro || LINEAR || — || align=right | 2.4 km || 
|-id=502 bgcolor=#fefefe
| 488502 ||  || — || September 24, 2000 || Socorro || LINEAR || — || align=right | 1.9 km || 
|-id=503 bgcolor=#d6d6d6
| 488503 ||  || — || September 28, 2000 || Socorro || LINEAR || TIR || align=right | 3.6 km || 
|-id=504 bgcolor=#fefefe
| 488504 ||  || — || September 21, 2000 || Kitt Peak || Spacewatch || — || align=right data-sort-value="0.72" | 720 m || 
|-id=505 bgcolor=#fefefe
| 488505 ||  || — || September 28, 2000 || Socorro || LINEAR || — || align=right | 1.2 km || 
|-id=506 bgcolor=#fefefe
| 488506 ||  || — || September 24, 2000 || Socorro || LINEAR || — || align=right data-sort-value="0.89" | 890 m || 
|-id=507 bgcolor=#d6d6d6
| 488507 ||  || — || September 30, 2000 || Anderson Mesa || LONEOS || — || align=right | 3.8 km || 
|-id=508 bgcolor=#E9E9E9
| 488508 ||  || — || October 24, 2000 || Socorro || LINEAR || — || align=right | 1.1 km || 
|-id=509 bgcolor=#FFC2E0
| 488509 ||  || — || October 27, 2000 || Socorro || LINEAR || AMO || align=right data-sort-value="0.27" | 270 m || 
|-id=510 bgcolor=#FA8072
| 488510 ||  || — || October 25, 2000 || Socorro || LINEAR || — || align=right data-sort-value="0.93" | 930 m || 
|-id=511 bgcolor=#fefefe
| 488511 ||  || — || October 25, 2000 || Socorro || LINEAR || — || align=right | 1.3 km || 
|-id=512 bgcolor=#E9E9E9
| 488512 ||  || — || October 25, 2000 || Socorro || LINEAR || — || align=right | 2.9 km || 
|-id=513 bgcolor=#fefefe
| 488513 ||  || — || November 21, 2000 || Socorro || LINEAR || H || align=right data-sort-value="0.68" | 680 m || 
|-id=514 bgcolor=#E9E9E9
| 488514 ||  || — || November 1, 2000 || Kitt Peak || Spacewatch || (5) || align=right data-sort-value="0.77" | 770 m || 
|-id=515 bgcolor=#FFC2E0
| 488515 ||  || — || March 26, 2001 || Anderson Mesa || LONEOS || APOPHAfastcritical || align=right data-sort-value="0.27" | 270 m || 
|-id=516 bgcolor=#E9E9E9
| 488516 ||  || — || March 18, 2001 || Socorro || LINEAR || EUN || align=right | 1.2 km || 
|-id=517 bgcolor=#E9E9E9
| 488517 ||  || — || June 24, 2001 || Palomar || NEAT || — || align=right | 2.5 km || 
|-id=518 bgcolor=#fefefe
| 488518 ||  || — || August 10, 2001 || Palomar || NEAT || — || align=right data-sort-value="0.74" | 740 m || 
|-id=519 bgcolor=#d6d6d6
| 488519 ||  || — || August 23, 2001 || Kitt Peak || Spacewatch || — || align=right | 3.2 km || 
|-id=520 bgcolor=#fefefe
| 488520 ||  || — || August 26, 2001 || Kitt Peak || Spacewatch || — || align=right data-sort-value="0.74" | 740 m || 
|-id=521 bgcolor=#d6d6d6
| 488521 ||  || — || August 22, 2001 || Socorro || LINEAR || Tj (2.96) || align=right | 3.4 km || 
|-id=522 bgcolor=#fefefe
| 488522 ||  || — || August 23, 2001 || Anderson Mesa || LONEOS || — || align=right data-sort-value="0.79" | 790 m || 
|-id=523 bgcolor=#fefefe
| 488523 ||  || — || August 16, 2001 || Socorro || LINEAR || — || align=right data-sort-value="0.65" | 650 m || 
|-id=524 bgcolor=#FA8072
| 488524 ||  || — || August 18, 2001 || Palomar || NEAT || — || align=right | 1.3 km || 
|-id=525 bgcolor=#E9E9E9
| 488525 ||  || — || September 7, 2001 || Socorro || LINEAR || — || align=right | 1.3 km || 
|-id=526 bgcolor=#fefefe
| 488526 ||  || — || September 8, 2001 || Socorro || LINEAR || — || align=right data-sort-value="0.75" | 750 m || 
|-id=527 bgcolor=#fefefe
| 488527 ||  || — || September 10, 2001 || Socorro || LINEAR || — || align=right data-sort-value="0.61" | 610 m || 
|-id=528 bgcolor=#d6d6d6
| 488528 ||  || — || September 10, 2001 || Eskridge || Farpoint Obs. || Tj (2.96) || align=right | 4.4 km || 
|-id=529 bgcolor=#fefefe
| 488529 ||  || — || September 11, 2001 || Anderson Mesa || LONEOS || — || align=right data-sort-value="0.70" | 700 m || 
|-id=530 bgcolor=#d6d6d6
| 488530 ||  || — || September 11, 2001 || Anderson Mesa || LONEOS || — || align=right | 3.4 km || 
|-id=531 bgcolor=#E9E9E9
| 488531 ||  || — || September 12, 2001 || Kitt Peak || Spacewatch || — || align=right | 1.6 km || 
|-id=532 bgcolor=#fefefe
| 488532 ||  || — || September 11, 2001 || Anderson Mesa || LONEOS || H || align=right data-sort-value="0.66" | 660 m || 
|-id=533 bgcolor=#d6d6d6
| 488533 ||  || — || September 12, 2001 || Socorro || LINEAR || — || align=right | 4.2 km || 
|-id=534 bgcolor=#d6d6d6
| 488534 ||  || — || August 27, 2001 || Kitt Peak || Spacewatch || — || align=right | 2.6 km || 
|-id=535 bgcolor=#d6d6d6
| 488535 ||  || — || September 16, 2001 || Socorro || LINEAR || — || align=right | 2.5 km || 
|-id=536 bgcolor=#fefefe
| 488536 ||  || — || September 17, 2001 || Socorro || LINEAR || — || align=right data-sort-value="0.74" | 740 m || 
|-id=537 bgcolor=#fefefe
| 488537 ||  || — || September 19, 2001 || Socorro || LINEAR || MAS || align=right data-sort-value="0.65" | 650 m || 
|-id=538 bgcolor=#fefefe
| 488538 ||  || — || September 19, 2001 || Socorro || LINEAR || — || align=right data-sort-value="0.55" | 550 m || 
|-id=539 bgcolor=#fefefe
| 488539 ||  || — || September 19, 2001 || Socorro || LINEAR || — || align=right data-sort-value="0.66" | 660 m || 
|-id=540 bgcolor=#fefefe
| 488540 ||  || — || September 19, 2001 || Socorro || LINEAR || critical || align=right data-sort-value="0.47" | 470 m || 
|-id=541 bgcolor=#fefefe
| 488541 ||  || — || September 19, 2001 || Socorro || LINEAR || — || align=right data-sort-value="0.81" | 810 m || 
|-id=542 bgcolor=#E9E9E9
| 488542 ||  || — || September 19, 2001 || Socorro || LINEAR || — || align=right | 2.7 km || 
|-id=543 bgcolor=#fefefe
| 488543 ||  || — || September 18, 2001 || Anderson Mesa || LONEOS || — || align=right data-sort-value="0.65" | 650 m || 
|-id=544 bgcolor=#fefefe
| 488544 ||  || — || September 27, 2001 || Palomar || NEAT || — || align=right data-sort-value="0.57" | 570 m || 
|-id=545 bgcolor=#fefefe
| 488545 ||  || — || October 14, 2001 || Socorro || LINEAR || — || align=right | 1.2 km || 
|-id=546 bgcolor=#d6d6d6
| 488546 ||  || — || October 14, 2001 || Socorro || LINEAR || LIX || align=right | 4.1 km || 
|-id=547 bgcolor=#fefefe
| 488547 ||  || — || October 13, 2001 || Socorro || LINEAR || NYS || align=right data-sort-value="0.58" | 580 m || 
|-id=548 bgcolor=#d6d6d6
| 488548 ||  || — || October 13, 2001 || Socorro || LINEAR || — || align=right | 2.4 km || 
|-id=549 bgcolor=#E9E9E9
| 488549 ||  || — || October 14, 2001 || Socorro || LINEAR || — || align=right | 2.8 km || 
|-id=550 bgcolor=#d6d6d6
| 488550 ||  || — || October 14, 2001 || Socorro || LINEAR || — || align=right | 3.0 km || 
|-id=551 bgcolor=#fefefe
| 488551 ||  || — || October 15, 2001 || Kitt Peak || Spacewatch || — || align=right data-sort-value="0.66" | 660 m || 
|-id=552 bgcolor=#E9E9E9
| 488552 ||  || — || October 10, 2001 || Palomar || NEAT || — || align=right data-sort-value="0.77" | 770 m || 
|-id=553 bgcolor=#d6d6d6
| 488553 ||  || — || October 14, 2001 || Apache Point || SDSS || 7:4 || align=right | 3.3 km || 
|-id=554 bgcolor=#E9E9E9
| 488554 ||  || — || October 18, 2001 || Socorro || LINEAR || — || align=right | 1.2 km || 
|-id=555 bgcolor=#d6d6d6
| 488555 ||  || — || October 21, 2001 || Socorro || LINEAR || — || align=right | 2.3 km || 
|-id=556 bgcolor=#d6d6d6
| 488556 ||  || — || October 17, 2001 || Socorro || LINEAR || — || align=right | 2.5 km || 
|-id=557 bgcolor=#fefefe
| 488557 ||  || — || October 18, 2001 || Palomar || NEAT || — || align=right data-sort-value="0.65" | 650 m || 
|-id=558 bgcolor=#d6d6d6
| 488558 ||  || — || October 18, 2001 || Palomar || NEAT || Tj (2.99) || align=right | 3.4 km || 
|-id=559 bgcolor=#fefefe
| 488559 ||  || — || October 18, 2001 || Palomar || NEAT || MAS || align=right data-sort-value="0.58" | 580 m || 
|-id=560 bgcolor=#E9E9E9
| 488560 ||  || — || October 21, 2001 || Socorro || LINEAR || — || align=right | 1.9 km || 
|-id=561 bgcolor=#fefefe
| 488561 ||  || — || October 23, 2001 || Palomar || NEAT || — || align=right data-sort-value="0.56" | 560 m || 
|-id=562 bgcolor=#E9E9E9
| 488562 ||  || — || October 17, 2001 || Socorro || LINEAR || — || align=right | 1.6 km || 
|-id=563 bgcolor=#fefefe
| 488563 ||  || — || October 15, 2001 || Socorro || LINEAR || — || align=right data-sort-value="0.89" | 890 m || 
|-id=564 bgcolor=#d6d6d6
| 488564 ||  || — || November 12, 2001 || Socorro || LINEAR || — || align=right | 2.8 km || 
|-id=565 bgcolor=#d6d6d6
| 488565 ||  || — || October 23, 2001 || Socorro || LINEAR || — || align=right | 3.1 km || 
|-id=566 bgcolor=#fefefe
| 488566 ||  || — || September 19, 2001 || Socorro || LINEAR || — || align=right data-sort-value="0.83" | 830 m || 
|-id=567 bgcolor=#d6d6d6
| 488567 ||  || — || November 19, 2001 || Socorro || LINEAR || — || align=right | 3.4 km || 
|-id=568 bgcolor=#d6d6d6
| 488568 ||  || — || December 9, 2001 || Socorro || LINEAR || — || align=right | 2.9 km || 
|-id=569 bgcolor=#E9E9E9
| 488569 ||  || — || December 9, 2001 || Socorro || LINEAR || — || align=right | 1.6 km || 
|-id=570 bgcolor=#E9E9E9
| 488570 ||  || — || November 17, 2001 || Socorro || LINEAR || — || align=right | 1.3 km || 
|-id=571 bgcolor=#d6d6d6
| 488571 ||  || — || December 15, 2001 || Socorro || LINEAR || LIX || align=right | 3.8 km || 
|-id=572 bgcolor=#fefefe
| 488572 ||  || — || December 10, 2001 || Kitt Peak || Spacewatch || — || align=right data-sort-value="0.85" | 850 m || 
|-id=573 bgcolor=#fefefe
| 488573 ||  || — || January 8, 2002 || Socorro || LINEAR || — || align=right data-sort-value="0.94" | 940 m || 
|-id=574 bgcolor=#d6d6d6
| 488574 ||  || — || December 14, 2001 || Socorro || LINEAR || — || align=right | 2.5 km || 
|-id=575 bgcolor=#E9E9E9
| 488575 ||  || — || February 7, 2002 || Socorro || LINEAR || — || align=right data-sort-value="0.82" | 820 m || 
|-id=576 bgcolor=#E9E9E9
| 488576 ||  || — || February 10, 2002 || Socorro || LINEAR || — || align=right data-sort-value="0.91" | 910 m || 
|-id=577 bgcolor=#fefefe
| 488577 ||  || — || February 8, 2002 || Kitt Peak || Spacewatch || — || align=right data-sort-value="0.82" | 820 m || 
|-id=578 bgcolor=#fefefe
| 488578 ||  || — || March 10, 2002 || Kitt Peak || Spacewatch || (2076) || align=right data-sort-value="0.58" | 580 m || 
|-id=579 bgcolor=#FFC2E0
| 488579 ||  || — || March 19, 2002 || Haleakala || NEAT || AMO || align=right data-sort-value="0.30" | 300 m || 
|-id=580 bgcolor=#FFC2E0
| 488580 ||  || — || April 13, 2002 || Kitt Peak || Spacewatch || AMO || align=right data-sort-value="0.41" | 410 m || 
|-id=581 bgcolor=#fefefe
| 488581 ||  || — || April 10, 2002 || Socorro || LINEAR || — || align=right data-sort-value="0.78" | 780 m || 
|-id=582 bgcolor=#FA8072
| 488582 ||  || — || June 9, 2002 || Socorro || LINEAR || — || align=right | 2.1 km || 
|-id=583 bgcolor=#d6d6d6
| 488583 ||  || — || July 5, 2002 || Socorro || LINEAR || — || align=right | 3.2 km || 
|-id=584 bgcolor=#d6d6d6
| 488584 ||  || — || July 29, 2002 || Palomar || NEAT || 3:2 || align=right | 3.6 km || 
|-id=585 bgcolor=#d6d6d6
| 488585 ||  || — || August 4, 2002 || Palomar || NEAT || — || align=right | 2.7 km || 
|-id=586 bgcolor=#d6d6d6
| 488586 ||  || — || August 12, 2002 || Socorro || LINEAR || — || align=right | 2.4 km || 
|-id=587 bgcolor=#FA8072
| 488587 ||  || — || August 14, 2002 || Socorro || LINEAR || — || align=right data-sort-value="0.66" | 660 m || 
|-id=588 bgcolor=#E9E9E9
| 488588 ||  || — || August 14, 2002 || Palomar || NEAT || — || align=right data-sort-value="0.98" | 980 m || 
|-id=589 bgcolor=#E9E9E9
| 488589 ||  || — || October 14, 1998 || Socorro || LINEAR || — || align=right | 1.3 km || 
|-id=590 bgcolor=#E9E9E9
| 488590 ||  || — || August 12, 2002 || Socorro || LINEAR || — || align=right | 1.0 km || 
|-id=591 bgcolor=#E9E9E9
| 488591 ||  || — || August 30, 2002 || Kitt Peak || Spacewatch || — || align=right | 1.9 km || 
|-id=592 bgcolor=#fefefe
| 488592 ||  || — || August 30, 2002 || Kitt Peak || Spacewatch || MAS || align=right data-sort-value="0.65" | 650 m || 
|-id=593 bgcolor=#E9E9E9
| 488593 ||  || — || August 27, 2002 || Palomar || NEAT || AEO || align=right data-sort-value="0.83" | 830 m || 
|-id=594 bgcolor=#fefefe
| 488594 ||  || — || October 18, 1999 || Kitt Peak || Spacewatch || — || align=right data-sort-value="0.54" | 540 m || 
|-id=595 bgcolor=#FA8072
| 488595 ||  || — || August 19, 2002 || Palomar || NEAT || critical || align=right data-sort-value="0.49" | 490 m || 
|-id=596 bgcolor=#fefefe
| 488596 ||  || — || August 18, 2002 || Palomar || NEAT || — || align=right data-sort-value="0.58" | 580 m || 
|-id=597 bgcolor=#fefefe
| 488597 ||  || — || August 16, 2002 || Haleakala || NEAT || — || align=right data-sort-value="0.69" | 690 m || 
|-id=598 bgcolor=#E9E9E9
| 488598 ||  || — || August 16, 2002 || Palomar || NEAT || — || align=right | 1.5 km || 
|-id=599 bgcolor=#E9E9E9
| 488599 ||  || — || October 30, 1994 || Kitt Peak || Spacewatch || — || align=right | 2.6 km || 
|-id=600 bgcolor=#d6d6d6
| 488600 ||  || — || September 5, 2002 || Socorro || LINEAR || Tj (2.96) || align=right | 5.3 km || 
|}

488601–488700 

|-bgcolor=#d6d6d6
| 488601 ||  || — || September 5, 2002 || Socorro || LINEAR || — || align=right | 4.1 km || 
|-id=602 bgcolor=#FA8072
| 488602 ||  || — || August 31, 2002 || Anderson Mesa || LONEOS || — || align=right data-sort-value="0.75" | 750 m || 
|-id=603 bgcolor=#E9E9E9
| 488603 ||  || — || September 5, 2002 || Socorro || LINEAR || RAF || align=right data-sort-value="0.97" | 970 m || 
|-id=604 bgcolor=#d6d6d6
| 488604 ||  || — || September 3, 2002 || Palomar || NEAT || — || align=right | 3.6 km || 
|-id=605 bgcolor=#fefefe
| 488605 ||  || — || September 6, 2002 || Socorro || LINEAR || critical || align=right data-sort-value="0.59" | 590 m || 
|-id=606 bgcolor=#d6d6d6
| 488606 ||  || — || September 7, 2002 || Socorro || LINEAR || — || align=right | 3.3 km || 
|-id=607 bgcolor=#d6d6d6
| 488607 ||  || — || September 14, 2002 || Palomar || NEAT || Tj (2.96) || align=right | 5.1 km || 
|-id=608 bgcolor=#E9E9E9
| 488608 ||  || — || September 14, 2002 || Palomar || NEAT || MRX || align=right data-sort-value="0.74" | 740 m || 
|-id=609 bgcolor=#d6d6d6
| 488609 ||  || — || September 14, 2002 || Palomar || NEAT || Tj (2.99) || align=right | 2.9 km || 
|-id=610 bgcolor=#E9E9E9
| 488610 ||  || — || September 5, 2002 || Socorro || LINEAR || — || align=right | 1.5 km || 
|-id=611 bgcolor=#d6d6d6
| 488611 ||  || — || September 14, 2002 || Palomar || NEAT || — || align=right | 1.5 km || 
|-id=612 bgcolor=#d6d6d6
| 488612 ||  || — || September 9, 2002 || Palomar || NEAT || — || align=right | 2.8 km || 
|-id=613 bgcolor=#d6d6d6
| 488613 ||  || — || September 13, 2002 || Palomar || NEAT || Tj (2.97) || align=right | 3.4 km || 
|-id=614 bgcolor=#E9E9E9
| 488614 ||  || — || September 3, 2002 || Palomar || NEAT || — || align=right data-sort-value="0.97" | 970 m || 
|-id=615 bgcolor=#FFC2E0
| 488615 ||  || — || September 21, 2002 || Palomar || NEAT || APO || align=right data-sort-value="0.17" | 170 m || 
|-id=616 bgcolor=#d6d6d6
| 488616 ||  || — || October 2, 2002 || Socorro || LINEAR || — || align=right | 2.5 km || 
|-id=617 bgcolor=#E9E9E9
| 488617 ||  || — || September 6, 2002 || Socorro || LINEAR || — || align=right | 1.4 km || 
|-id=618 bgcolor=#d6d6d6
| 488618 ||  || — || October 4, 2002 || Palomar || NEAT || — || align=right | 2.5 km || 
|-id=619 bgcolor=#E9E9E9
| 488619 ||  || — || October 5, 2002 || Socorro || LINEAR || — || align=right | 2.3 km || 
|-id=620 bgcolor=#d6d6d6
| 488620 ||  || — || October 9, 2002 || Socorro || LINEAR || — || align=right | 2.7 km || 
|-id=621 bgcolor=#FA8072
| 488621 ||  || — || October 9, 2002 || Socorro || LINEAR || — || align=right | 1.5 km || 
|-id=622 bgcolor=#fefefe
| 488622 ||  || — || October 10, 2002 || Socorro || LINEAR || H || align=right data-sort-value="0.85" | 850 m || 
|-id=623 bgcolor=#E9E9E9
| 488623 ||  || — || October 12, 2002 || Socorro || LINEAR || — || align=right | 1.0 km || 
|-id=624 bgcolor=#d6d6d6
| 488624 ||  || — || October 4, 2002 || Apache Point || SDSS || — || align=right | 2.1 km || 
|-id=625 bgcolor=#fefefe
| 488625 ||  || — || October 4, 2002 || Apache Point || SDSS || — || align=right data-sort-value="0.73" | 730 m || 
|-id=626 bgcolor=#d6d6d6
| 488626 ||  || — || October 4, 2002 || Apache Point || SDSS || — || align=right | 2.4 km || 
|-id=627 bgcolor=#E9E9E9
| 488627 ||  || — || October 4, 2002 || Apache Point || SDSS || BRG || align=right | 1.5 km || 
|-id=628 bgcolor=#fefefe
| 488628 ||  || — || October 5, 2002 || Apache Point || SDSS || — || align=right data-sort-value="0.56" | 560 m || 
|-id=629 bgcolor=#d6d6d6
| 488629 ||  || — || May 26, 2001 || Kitt Peak || Spacewatch || — || align=right | 2.7 km || 
|-id=630 bgcolor=#fefefe
| 488630 ||  || — || October 10, 2002 || Apache Point || SDSS || — || align=right data-sort-value="0.45" | 450 m || 
|-id=631 bgcolor=#fefefe
| 488631 ||  || — || October 25, 2002 || Palomar || NEAT || — || align=right data-sort-value="0.72" | 720 m || 
|-id=632 bgcolor=#E9E9E9
| 488632 ||  || — || October 30, 2002 || Palomar || NEAT || ADE || align=right | 1.8 km || 
|-id=633 bgcolor=#d6d6d6
| 488633 ||  || — || October 16, 2002 || Palomar || NEAT || — || align=right | 1.6 km || 
|-id=634 bgcolor=#d6d6d6
| 488634 ||  || — || November 11, 2002 || Anderson Mesa || LONEOS || — || align=right | 3.7 km || 
|-id=635 bgcolor=#fefefe
| 488635 ||  || — || November 11, 2002 || Socorro || LINEAR || — || align=right data-sort-value="0.80" | 800 m || 
|-id=636 bgcolor=#FFC2E0
| 488636 ||  || — || November 30, 2002 || Haleakala || NEAT || AMOcritical || align=right data-sort-value="0.47" | 470 m || 
|-id=637 bgcolor=#d6d6d6
| 488637 ||  || — || December 13, 2002 || Socorro || LINEAR || Tj (2.95) || align=right | 3.0 km || 
|-id=638 bgcolor=#fefefe
| 488638 ||  || — || January 11, 2003 || Socorro || LINEAR || — || align=right | 1.2 km || 
|-id=639 bgcolor=#fefefe
| 488639 ||  || — || January 8, 2003 || Socorro || LINEAR || H || align=right data-sort-value="0.79" | 790 m || 
|-id=640 bgcolor=#FFC2E0
| 488640 ||  || — || March 28, 2003 || Kitt Peak || Spacewatch || AMO || align=right data-sort-value="0.51" | 510 m || 
|-id=641 bgcolor=#E9E9E9
| 488641 ||  || — || March 24, 2003 || Kitt Peak || Spacewatch || — || align=right | 2.9 km || 
|-id=642 bgcolor=#E9E9E9
| 488642 ||  || — || March 23, 2003 || Kitt Peak || Spacewatch || — || align=right | 1.4 km || 
|-id=643 bgcolor=#fefefe
| 488643 ||  || — || April 7, 2003 || Kitt Peak || Spacewatch || H || align=right data-sort-value="0.62" | 620 m || 
|-id=644 bgcolor=#C2E0FF
| 488644 ||  || — || April 26, 2003 || Mauna Kea || Mauna Kea Obs. || cubewano (cold)critical || align=right | 117 km || 
|-id=645 bgcolor=#FFC2E0
| 488645 ||  || — || July 21, 2003 || Haleakala || NEAT || APO || align=right data-sort-value="0.74" | 740 m || 
|-id=646 bgcolor=#FA8072
| 488646 ||  || — || August 26, 2003 || Socorro || LINEAR || — || align=right data-sort-value="0.50" | 500 m || 
|-id=647 bgcolor=#fefefe
| 488647 ||  || — || August 23, 2003 || Cerro Tololo || M. W. Buie || — || align=right data-sort-value="0.63" | 630 m || 
|-id=648 bgcolor=#E9E9E9
| 488648 ||  || — || September 19, 2003 || Kitt Peak || Spacewatch || — || align=right | 1.2 km || 
|-id=649 bgcolor=#d6d6d6
| 488649 ||  || — || September 18, 2003 || Kitt Peak || Spacewatch || — || align=right | 2.3 km || 
|-id=650 bgcolor=#fefefe
| 488650 ||  || — || September 19, 2003 || Kitt Peak || Spacewatch || — || align=right | 1.0 km || 
|-id=651 bgcolor=#E9E9E9
| 488651 ||  || — || September 20, 2003 || Kitt Peak || Spacewatch || NEM || align=right | 2.0 km || 
|-id=652 bgcolor=#E9E9E9
| 488652 ||  || — || September 20, 2003 || Socorro || LINEAR || — || align=right | 2.0 km || 
|-id=653 bgcolor=#fefefe
| 488653 ||  || — || September 20, 2003 || Campo Imperatore || CINEOS || — || align=right | 1.2 km || 
|-id=654 bgcolor=#fefefe
| 488654 ||  || — || September 27, 2003 || Kitt Peak || Spacewatch || — || align=right data-sort-value="0.70" | 700 m || 
|-id=655 bgcolor=#fefefe
| 488655 ||  || — || September 19, 2003 || Kitt Peak || Spacewatch || — || align=right data-sort-value="0.69" | 690 m || 
|-id=656 bgcolor=#fefefe
| 488656 ||  || — || September 18, 2003 || Kitt Peak || Spacewatch || NYS || align=right data-sort-value="0.61" | 610 m || 
|-id=657 bgcolor=#d6d6d6
| 488657 ||  || — || September 27, 2003 || Kitt Peak || Spacewatch || LIX || align=right | 4.2 km || 
|-id=658 bgcolor=#FA8072
| 488658 ||  || — || September 29, 2003 || Socorro || LINEAR || — || align=right data-sort-value="0.70" | 700 m || 
|-id=659 bgcolor=#d6d6d6
| 488659 ||  || — || September 17, 2003 || Kitt Peak || Spacewatch || — || align=right | 2.8 km || 
|-id=660 bgcolor=#E9E9E9
| 488660 ||  || — || September 27, 2003 || Socorro || LINEAR || — || align=right | 2.0 km || 
|-id=661 bgcolor=#fefefe
| 488661 ||  || — || September 20, 2003 || Campo Imperatore || CINEOS || MAS || align=right data-sort-value="0.54" | 540 m || 
|-id=662 bgcolor=#E9E9E9
| 488662 ||  || — || September 1, 2003 || Socorro || LINEAR || — || align=right | 1.5 km || 
|-id=663 bgcolor=#E9E9E9
| 488663 ||  || — || September 22, 2003 || Kitt Peak || Spacewatch || — || align=right data-sort-value="0.89" | 890 m || 
|-id=664 bgcolor=#d6d6d6
| 488664 ||  || — || September 19, 2003 || Kitt Peak || Spacewatch || — || align=right | 2.4 km || 
|-id=665 bgcolor=#E9E9E9
| 488665 ||  || — || September 26, 2003 || Apache Point || SDSS || — || align=right | 1.7 km || 
|-id=666 bgcolor=#fefefe
| 488666 ||  || — || September 28, 2003 || Apache Point || SDSS || — || align=right data-sort-value="0.62" | 620 m || 
|-id=667 bgcolor=#d6d6d6
| 488667 ||  || — || October 1, 2003 || Kitt Peak || Spacewatch || — || align=right | 2.7 km || 
|-id=668 bgcolor=#fefefe
| 488668 ||  || — || October 2, 2003 || Kitt Peak || Spacewatch || — || align=right data-sort-value="0.72" | 720 m || 
|-id=669 bgcolor=#d6d6d6
| 488669 ||  || — || October 19, 2003 || Kitt Peak || Spacewatch || Tj (2.95) || align=right | 8.1 km || 
|-id=670 bgcolor=#E9E9E9
| 488670 ||  || — || October 19, 2003 || Palomar || NEAT || — || align=right | 1.1 km || 
|-id=671 bgcolor=#E9E9E9
| 488671 ||  || — || October 22, 2003 || Socorro || LINEAR || — || align=right | 2.2 km || 
|-id=672 bgcolor=#E9E9E9
| 488672 ||  || — || October 19, 2003 || Kitt Peak || Spacewatch || — || align=right | 2.0 km || 
|-id=673 bgcolor=#d6d6d6
| 488673 ||  || — || October 21, 2003 || Anderson Mesa || LONEOS || — || align=right | 3.2 km || 
|-id=674 bgcolor=#E9E9E9
| 488674 ||  || — || October 21, 2003 || Kitt Peak || Spacewatch || — || align=right | 2.0 km || 
|-id=675 bgcolor=#fefefe
| 488675 ||  || — || September 28, 2003 || Kitt Peak || Spacewatch || — || align=right data-sort-value="0.76" | 760 m || 
|-id=676 bgcolor=#E9E9E9
| 488676 ||  || — || October 22, 2003 || Kitt Peak || Spacewatch || GEF || align=right | 1.2 km || 
|-id=677 bgcolor=#E9E9E9
| 488677 ||  || — || October 23, 2003 || Kitt Peak || Spacewatch || GEF || align=right | 1.2 km || 
|-id=678 bgcolor=#E9E9E9
| 488678 ||  || — || October 30, 2003 || Socorro || LINEAR || — || align=right | 1.0 km || 
|-id=679 bgcolor=#E9E9E9
| 488679 ||  || — || October 16, 2003 || Kitt Peak || Spacewatch || — || align=right | 2.1 km || 
|-id=680 bgcolor=#d6d6d6
| 488680 ||  || — || October 16, 2003 || Kitt Peak || Spacewatch || — || align=right | 2.7 km || 
|-id=681 bgcolor=#E9E9E9
| 488681 ||  || — || October 17, 2003 || Apache Point || SDSS || — || align=right data-sort-value="0.91" | 910 m || 
|-id=682 bgcolor=#d6d6d6
| 488682 ||  || — || October 18, 2003 || Apache Point || SDSS || — || align=right | 2.4 km || 
|-id=683 bgcolor=#E9E9E9
| 488683 ||  || — || October 18, 2003 || Kitt Peak || Spacewatch || — || align=right | 2.2 km || 
|-id=684 bgcolor=#E9E9E9
| 488684 ||  || — || October 19, 2003 || Apache Point || SDSS || — || align=right | 1.7 km || 
|-id=685 bgcolor=#d6d6d6
| 488685 ||  || — || October 22, 2003 || Apache Point || SDSS || — || align=right | 2.8 km || 
|-id=686 bgcolor=#d6d6d6
| 488686 ||  || — || October 19, 2003 || Kitt Peak || Spacewatch || — || align=right | 3.2 km || 
|-id=687 bgcolor=#d6d6d6
| 488687 ||  || — || October 20, 2003 || Kitt Peak || Spacewatch || — || align=right | 2.5 km || 
|-id=688 bgcolor=#d6d6d6
| 488688 ||  || — || November 18, 2003 || Catalina || CSS || — || align=right | 4.1 km || 
|-id=689 bgcolor=#fefefe
| 488689 ||  || — || November 16, 2003 || Kitt Peak || Spacewatch || — || align=right data-sort-value="0.94" | 940 m || 
|-id=690 bgcolor=#E9E9E9
| 488690 ||  || — || November 3, 2003 || Socorro || LINEAR || — || align=right | 2.1 km || 
|-id=691 bgcolor=#fefefe
| 488691 ||  || — || November 20, 2003 || Socorro || LINEAR || H || align=right data-sort-value="0.54" | 540 m || 
|-id=692 bgcolor=#FA8072
| 488692 ||  || — || November 23, 2003 || Socorro || LINEAR || H || align=right data-sort-value="0.56" | 560 m || 
|-id=693 bgcolor=#FFC2E0
| 488693 ||  || — || November 24, 2003 || Anderson Mesa || LONEOS || AMO +1km || align=right | 1.4 km || 
|-id=694 bgcolor=#E9E9E9
| 488694 ||  || — || November 19, 2003 || Socorro || LINEAR || — || align=right data-sort-value="0.87" | 870 m || 
|-id=695 bgcolor=#d6d6d6
| 488695 ||  || — || November 23, 2003 || Kitt Peak || M. W. Buie || — || align=right | 2.3 km || 
|-id=696 bgcolor=#d6d6d6
| 488696 ||  || — || November 23, 2003 || Socorro || LINEAR || — || align=right | 2.8 km || 
|-id=697 bgcolor=#FA8072
| 488697 ||  || — || December 4, 2003 || Socorro || LINEAR || — || align=right | 1.5 km || 
|-id=698 bgcolor=#FFC2E0
| 488698 ||  || — || December 11, 2003 || Socorro || LINEAR || APO || align=right data-sort-value="0.49" | 490 m || 
|-id=699 bgcolor=#d6d6d6
| 488699 ||  || — || December 1, 2003 || Kitt Peak || Spacewatch || — || align=right | 4.2 km || 
|-id=700 bgcolor=#E9E9E9
| 488700 ||  || — || December 18, 2003 || Socorro || LINEAR || — || align=right data-sort-value="0.93" | 930 m || 
|}

488701–488800 

|-bgcolor=#E9E9E9
| 488701 ||  || — || December 23, 2003 || Socorro || LINEAR || — || align=right | 1.3 km || 
|-id=702 bgcolor=#FA8072
| 488702 ||  || — || December 27, 2003 || Socorro || LINEAR || — || align=right data-sort-value="0.74" | 740 m || 
|-id=703 bgcolor=#d6d6d6
| 488703 ||  || — || December 22, 2003 || Kitt Peak || Spacewatch || — || align=right | 3.9 km || 
|-id=704 bgcolor=#E9E9E9
| 488704 ||  || — || January 21, 2004 || Socorro || LINEAR || — || align=right data-sort-value="0.98" | 980 m || 
|-id=705 bgcolor=#E9E9E9
| 488705 ||  || — || January 22, 2004 || Socorro || LINEAR || — || align=right | 1.2 km || 
|-id=706 bgcolor=#E9E9E9
| 488706 ||  || — || January 16, 2004 || Kitt Peak || Spacewatch || — || align=right data-sort-value="0.63" | 630 m || 
|-id=707 bgcolor=#E9E9E9
| 488707 ||  || — || February 12, 2004 || Palomar || NEAT || — || align=right | 1.6 km || 
|-id=708 bgcolor=#E9E9E9
| 488708 ||  || — || January 22, 2004 || Socorro || LINEAR || — || align=right | 1.5 km || 
|-id=709 bgcolor=#E9E9E9
| 488709 ||  || — || January 31, 2004 || Kitt Peak || Spacewatch || — || align=right | 1.4 km || 
|-id=710 bgcolor=#E9E9E9
| 488710 ||  || — || January 30, 2004 || Kitt Peak || Spacewatch || EUN || align=right | 1.3 km || 
|-id=711 bgcolor=#E9E9E9
| 488711 ||  || — || January 28, 2004 || Socorro || LINEAR || — || align=right | 1.6 km || 
|-id=712 bgcolor=#E9E9E9
| 488712 ||  || — || March 15, 2004 || Kitt Peak || Spacewatch || — || align=right | 1.3 km || 
|-id=713 bgcolor=#E9E9E9
| 488713 ||  || — || March 17, 2004 || Kitt Peak || Spacewatch || — || align=right | 1.2 km || 
|-id=714 bgcolor=#E9E9E9
| 488714 ||  || — || March 16, 2004 || Socorro || LINEAR || — || align=right | 1.3 km || 
|-id=715 bgcolor=#E9E9E9
| 488715 ||  || — || March 15, 2004 || Socorro || LINEAR || JUN || align=right | 1.1 km || 
|-id=716 bgcolor=#E9E9E9
| 488716 ||  || — || March 15, 2004 || Catalina || CSS || — || align=right | 1.4 km || 
|-id=717 bgcolor=#fefefe
| 488717 ||  || — || March 15, 2004 || Kitt Peak || Spacewatch || — || align=right data-sort-value="0.60" | 600 m || 
|-id=718 bgcolor=#E9E9E9
| 488718 ||  || — || March 16, 2004 || Siding Spring || SSS || — || align=right | 1.6 km || 
|-id=719 bgcolor=#E9E9E9
| 488719 ||  || — || March 26, 2004 || Anderson Mesa || LONEOS || — || align=right | 1.3 km || 
|-id=720 bgcolor=#E9E9E9
| 488720 ||  || — || April 12, 2004 || Kitt Peak || Spacewatch || — || align=right | 1.1 km || 
|-id=721 bgcolor=#fefefe
| 488721 ||  || — || April 12, 2004 || Catalina || CSS || H || align=right data-sort-value="0.91" | 910 m || 
|-id=722 bgcolor=#E9E9E9
| 488722 ||  || — || April 19, 2004 || Kitt Peak || Spacewatch || — || align=right | 1.6 km || 
|-id=723 bgcolor=#fefefe
| 488723 ||  || — || May 15, 2004 || Socorro || LINEAR || — || align=right | 1.0 km || 
|-id=724 bgcolor=#fefefe
| 488724 ||  || — || July 11, 2004 || Socorro || LINEAR || (883) || align=right data-sort-value="0.66" | 660 m || 
|-id=725 bgcolor=#E9E9E9
| 488725 ||  || — || August 15, 2004 || Siding Spring || SSS || — || align=right | 2.6 km || 
|-id=726 bgcolor=#FA8072
| 488726 ||  || — || August 12, 2004 || Socorro || LINEAR || — || align=right data-sort-value="0.69" | 690 m || 
|-id=727 bgcolor=#E9E9E9
| 488727 ||  || — || August 12, 2004 || Campo Imperatore || CINEOS || — || align=right | 1.5 km || 
|-id=728 bgcolor=#fefefe
| 488728 ||  || — || August 27, 2004 || Anderson Mesa || LONEOS || — || align=right data-sort-value="0.85" | 850 m || 
|-id=729 bgcolor=#FA8072
| 488729 ||  || — || August 21, 2004 || Catalina || CSS || — || align=right data-sort-value="0.61" | 610 m || 
|-id=730 bgcolor=#fefefe
| 488730 ||  || — || September 7, 2004 || Kitt Peak || Spacewatch || — || align=right data-sort-value="0.88" | 880 m || 
|-id=731 bgcolor=#E9E9E9
| 488731 ||  || — || September 7, 2004 || Socorro || LINEAR || — || align=right | 1.7 km || 
|-id=732 bgcolor=#fefefe
| 488732 ||  || — || August 8, 2004 || Campo Imperatore || CINEOS || — || align=right data-sort-value="0.62" | 620 m || 
|-id=733 bgcolor=#fefefe
| 488733 ||  || — || September 7, 2004 || Kitt Peak || Spacewatch || — || align=right data-sort-value="0.75" | 750 m || 
|-id=734 bgcolor=#E9E9E9
| 488734 ||  || — || August 25, 2004 || Kitt Peak || Spacewatch || — || align=right | 1.5 km || 
|-id=735 bgcolor=#fefefe
| 488735 ||  || — || September 9, 2004 || Kitt Peak || Spacewatch || — || align=right data-sort-value="0.67" | 670 m || 
|-id=736 bgcolor=#FA8072
| 488736 ||  || — || August 26, 2004 || Anderson Mesa || LONEOS || — || align=right data-sort-value="0.99" | 990 m || 
|-id=737 bgcolor=#E9E9E9
| 488737 ||  || — || September 7, 2004 || Socorro || LINEAR || — || align=right | 2.4 km || 
|-id=738 bgcolor=#FA8072
| 488738 ||  || — || September 11, 2004 || Socorro || LINEAR || — || align=right data-sort-value="0.65" | 650 m || 
|-id=739 bgcolor=#fefefe
| 488739 ||  || — || August 13, 2004 || Socorro || LINEAR || H || align=right data-sort-value="0.82" | 820 m || 
|-id=740 bgcolor=#fefefe
| 488740 ||  || — || September 10, 2004 || Socorro || LINEAR || — || align=right data-sort-value="0.83" | 830 m || 
|-id=741 bgcolor=#d6d6d6
| 488741 ||  || — || September 11, 2004 || Socorro || LINEAR || THB || align=right | 3.0 km || 
|-id=742 bgcolor=#d6d6d6
| 488742 ||  || — || September 12, 2004 || Socorro || LINEAR || Tj (2.99) || align=right | 3.7 km || 
|-id=743 bgcolor=#FA8072
| 488743 ||  || — || September 14, 2004 || Siding Spring || SSS || H || align=right data-sort-value="0.62" | 620 m || 
|-id=744 bgcolor=#fefefe
| 488744 ||  || — || September 6, 2004 || Palomar || NEAT || — || align=right | 1.1 km || 
|-id=745 bgcolor=#d6d6d6
| 488745 ||  || — || September 10, 2004 || Socorro || LINEAR || — || align=right | 2.9 km || 
|-id=746 bgcolor=#E9E9E9
| 488746 ||  || — || September 15, 2004 || Kitt Peak || Spacewatch || — || align=right data-sort-value="0.92" | 920 m || 
|-id=747 bgcolor=#FA8072
| 488747 ||  || — || September 10, 2004 || Socorro || LINEAR || — || align=right data-sort-value="0.57" | 570 m || 
|-id=748 bgcolor=#fefefe
| 488748 ||  || — || September 8, 2004 || Socorro || LINEAR || — || align=right data-sort-value="0.71" | 710 m || 
|-id=749 bgcolor=#FA8072
| 488749 ||  || — || September 18, 2004 || Socorro || LINEAR || — || align=right | 1.0 km || 
|-id=750 bgcolor=#fefefe
| 488750 ||  || — || September 22, 2004 || Desert Eagle || W. K. Y. Yeung || V || align=right data-sort-value="0.74" | 740 m || 
|-id=751 bgcolor=#E9E9E9
| 488751 ||  || — || September 17, 2004 || Socorro || LINEAR || — || align=right | 2.1 km || 
|-id=752 bgcolor=#E9E9E9
| 488752 ||  || — || August 25, 2004 || Kitt Peak || Spacewatch || CLO || align=right | 1.6 km || 
|-id=753 bgcolor=#fefefe
| 488753 ||  || — || September 17, 2004 || Anderson Mesa || LONEOS || — || align=right | 1.1 km || 
|-id=754 bgcolor=#E9E9E9
| 488754 ||  || — || September 18, 2004 || Socorro || LINEAR || — || align=right data-sort-value="0.80" | 800 m || 
|-id=755 bgcolor=#fefefe
| 488755 ||  || — || September 10, 2004 || Socorro || LINEAR || — || align=right data-sort-value="0.94" | 940 m || 
|-id=756 bgcolor=#E9E9E9
| 488756 ||  || — || October 4, 2004 || Kitt Peak || Spacewatch || — || align=right | 1.2 km || 
|-id=757 bgcolor=#fefefe
| 488757 ||  || — || September 23, 2004 || Kitt Peak || Spacewatch || V || align=right data-sort-value="0.56" | 560 m || 
|-id=758 bgcolor=#E9E9E9
| 488758 ||  || — || October 4, 2004 || Anderson Mesa || LONEOS || (5) || align=right data-sort-value="0.70" | 700 m || 
|-id=759 bgcolor=#fefefe
| 488759 ||  || — || September 7, 2004 || Kitt Peak || Spacewatch || — || align=right data-sort-value="0.66" | 660 m || 
|-id=760 bgcolor=#E9E9E9
| 488760 ||  || — || September 22, 2004 || Kitt Peak || Spacewatch || — || align=right | 1.6 km || 
|-id=761 bgcolor=#fefefe
| 488761 ||  || — || October 5, 2004 || Kitt Peak || Spacewatch || MAScritical || align=right data-sort-value="0.59" | 590 m || 
|-id=762 bgcolor=#E9E9E9
| 488762 ||  || — || September 7, 2004 || Kitt Peak || Spacewatch || — || align=right | 2.2 km || 
|-id=763 bgcolor=#d6d6d6
| 488763 ||  || — || September 18, 2004 || Socorro || LINEAR || critical || align=right | 1.5 km || 
|-id=764 bgcolor=#fefefe
| 488764 ||  || — || October 5, 2004 || Kitt Peak || Spacewatch || NYS || align=right data-sort-value="0.38" | 380 m || 
|-id=765 bgcolor=#d6d6d6
| 488765 ||  || — || September 14, 2004 || Socorro || LINEAR || — || align=right | 3.7 km || 
|-id=766 bgcolor=#E9E9E9
| 488766 ||  || — || October 8, 2004 || Anderson Mesa || LONEOS || — || align=right data-sort-value="0.99" | 990 m || 
|-id=767 bgcolor=#E9E9E9
| 488767 ||  || — || October 9, 2004 || Anderson Mesa || LONEOS || — || align=right | 1.7 km || 
|-id=768 bgcolor=#fefefe
| 488768 ||  || — || October 5, 2004 || Kitt Peak || Spacewatch || V || align=right data-sort-value="0.68" | 680 m || 
|-id=769 bgcolor=#fefefe
| 488769 ||  || — || October 7, 2004 || Socorro || LINEAR || — || align=right data-sort-value="0.92" | 920 m || 
|-id=770 bgcolor=#d6d6d6
| 488770 ||  || — || October 7, 2004 || Kitt Peak || Spacewatch || — || align=right | 2.6 km || 
|-id=771 bgcolor=#fefefe
| 488771 ||  || — || October 4, 2004 || Kitt Peak || Spacewatch || MAS || align=right data-sort-value="0.71" | 710 m || 
|-id=772 bgcolor=#fefefe
| 488772 ||  || — || September 17, 2004 || Kitt Peak || Spacewatch || MAScritical || align=right data-sort-value="0.52" | 520 m || 
|-id=773 bgcolor=#E9E9E9
| 488773 ||  || — || October 10, 2004 || Kitt Peak || Spacewatch || — || align=right | 2.4 km || 
|-id=774 bgcolor=#E9E9E9
| 488774 ||  || — || September 15, 2004 || Kitt Peak || Spacewatch || — || align=right | 1.3 km || 
|-id=775 bgcolor=#d6d6d6
| 488775 ||  || — || October 7, 2004 || Kitt Peak || Spacewatch || — || align=right | 1.8 km || 
|-id=776 bgcolor=#fefefe
| 488776 ||  || — || October 9, 2004 || Kitt Peak || Spacewatch || NYS || align=right data-sort-value="0.60" | 600 m || 
|-id=777 bgcolor=#d6d6d6
| 488777 ||  || — || October 9, 2004 || Socorro || LINEAR || — || align=right | 3.2 km || 
|-id=778 bgcolor=#fefefe
| 488778 ||  || — || October 10, 2004 || Kitt Peak || Spacewatch || — || align=right data-sort-value="0.82" | 820 m || 
|-id=779 bgcolor=#fefefe
| 488779 ||  || — || October 13, 2004 || Kitt Peak || Spacewatch || — || align=right data-sort-value="0.87" | 870 m || 
|-id=780 bgcolor=#fefefe
| 488780 ||  || — || October 10, 2004 || Kitt Peak || Spacewatch || — || align=right data-sort-value="0.54" | 540 m || 
|-id=781 bgcolor=#E9E9E9
| 488781 ||  || — || October 4, 2004 || Kitt Peak || Spacewatch || — || align=right | 2.5 km || 
|-id=782 bgcolor=#E9E9E9
| 488782 ||  || — || October 23, 2004 || Kitt Peak || Spacewatch || — || align=right | 1.2 km || 
|-id=783 bgcolor=#E9E9E9
| 488783 ||  || — || October 11, 2004 || Kitt Peak || Spacewatch || — || align=right | 2.2 km || 
|-id=784 bgcolor=#E9E9E9
| 488784 ||  || — || October 8, 2004 || Anderson Mesa || LONEOS || — || align=right | 2.0 km || 
|-id=785 bgcolor=#E9E9E9
| 488785 ||  || — || November 17, 2004 || Campo Imperatore || CINEOS || EUN || align=right data-sort-value="0.95" | 950 m || 
|-id=786 bgcolor=#E9E9E9
| 488786 ||  || — || December 4, 2004 || Jonathan B. Postel || Jonathan B. Postel Obs. || — || align=right | 1.2 km || 
|-id=787 bgcolor=#E9E9E9
| 488787 ||  || — || December 9, 2004 || Kitt Peak || Spacewatch || — || align=right | 1.5 km || 
|-id=788 bgcolor=#FA8072
| 488788 ||  || — || September 24, 2004 || Socorro || LINEAR || — || align=right data-sort-value="0.71" | 710 m || 
|-id=789 bgcolor=#FFC2E0
| 488789 ||  || — || December 14, 2004 || Anderson Mesa || LONEOS || APOPHA || align=right | 1.0 km || 
|-id=790 bgcolor=#E9E9E9
| 488790 ||  || — || December 9, 2004 || Catalina || CSS || — || align=right | 1.9 km || 
|-id=791 bgcolor=#E9E9E9
| 488791 ||  || — || December 15, 2004 || Socorro || LINEAR || — || align=right | 1.7 km || 
|-id=792 bgcolor=#E9E9E9
| 488792 ||  || — || December 14, 2004 || Kitt Peak || Spacewatch || — || align=right | 2.2 km || 
|-id=793 bgcolor=#E9E9E9
| 488793 ||  || — || January 1, 2005 || Catalina || CSS || — || align=right data-sort-value="0.99" | 990 m || 
|-id=794 bgcolor=#d6d6d6
| 488794 ||  || — || January 13, 2005 || Kitt Peak || Spacewatch || Tj (2.98) || align=right | 4.2 km || 
|-id=795 bgcolor=#d6d6d6
| 488795 ||  || — || January 13, 2005 || Kitt Peak || Spacewatch || — || align=right | 3.8 km || 
|-id=796 bgcolor=#d6d6d6
| 488796 ||  || — || December 18, 2004 || Kitt Peak || Spacewatch || — || align=right | 3.0 km || 
|-id=797 bgcolor=#E9E9E9
| 488797 ||  || — || February 2, 2005 || Catalina || CSS || — || align=right data-sort-value="0.94" | 940 m || 
|-id=798 bgcolor=#E9E9E9
| 488798 ||  || — || March 3, 2005 || Kitt Peak || Spacewatch || — || align=right | 1.5 km || 
|-id=799 bgcolor=#FA8072
| 488799 ||  || — || March 8, 2005 || Anderson Mesa || LONEOS || — || align=right data-sort-value="0.79" | 790 m || 
|-id=800 bgcolor=#E9E9E9
| 488800 ||  || — || March 8, 2005 || Kitt Peak || Spacewatch || — || align=right data-sort-value="0.79" | 790 m || 
|}

488801–488900 

|-bgcolor=#FA8072
| 488801 ||  || — || March 9, 2005 || Catalina || CSS || — || align=right data-sort-value="0.67" | 670 m || 
|-id=802 bgcolor=#d6d6d6
| 488802 ||  || — || March 8, 2005 || Kitt Peak || Spacewatch || — || align=right | 3.5 km || 
|-id=803 bgcolor=#FFC2E0
| 488803 ||  || — || April 12, 2005 || Anderson Mesa || LONEOS || ATE || align=right data-sort-value="0.21" | 210 m || 
|-id=804 bgcolor=#E9E9E9
| 488804 ||  || — || April 10, 2005 || Mount Lemmon || Mount Lemmon Survey || — || align=right | 1.2 km || 
|-id=805 bgcolor=#E9E9E9
| 488805 ||  || — || April 2, 2005 || Mount Lemmon || Mount Lemmon Survey || — || align=right data-sort-value="0.86" | 860 m || 
|-id=806 bgcolor=#E9E9E9
| 488806 ||  || — || April 4, 2005 || Mount Lemmon || Mount Lemmon Survey || — || align=right data-sort-value="0.86" | 860 m || 
|-id=807 bgcolor=#d6d6d6
| 488807 ||  || — || May 4, 2005 || Mauna Kea || C. Veillet || — || align=right | 3.4 km || 
|-id=808 bgcolor=#d6d6d6
| 488808 ||  || — || May 4, 2005 || Mauna Kea || C. Veillet || — || align=right | 1.9 km || 
|-id=809 bgcolor=#E9E9E9
| 488809 ||  || — || May 6, 2005 || Kitt Peak || Spacewatch || — || align=right | 1.0 km || 
|-id=810 bgcolor=#E9E9E9
| 488810 ||  || — || May 8, 2005 || Kitt Peak || Spacewatch || — || align=right data-sort-value="0.76" | 760 m || 
|-id=811 bgcolor=#E9E9E9
| 488811 ||  || — || May 8, 2005 || Kitt Peak || Spacewatch || EUN || align=right | 1.2 km || 
|-id=812 bgcolor=#E9E9E9
| 488812 ||  || — || May 3, 2005 || Kitt Peak || Spacewatch || — || align=right | 1.7 km || 
|-id=813 bgcolor=#E9E9E9
| 488813 ||  || — || May 4, 2005 || Kitt Peak || Spacewatch || — || align=right data-sort-value="0.88" | 880 m || 
|-id=814 bgcolor=#E9E9E9
| 488814 ||  || — || May 8, 2005 || Mount Lemmon || Mount Lemmon Survey || — || align=right | 1.6 km || 
|-id=815 bgcolor=#E9E9E9
| 488815 ||  || — || June 13, 2005 || Mount Lemmon || Mount Lemmon Survey || — || align=right | 2.3 km || 
|-id=816 bgcolor=#E9E9E9
| 488816 ||  || — || June 15, 2005 || Mount Lemmon || Mount Lemmon Survey || — || align=right | 1.1 km || 
|-id=817 bgcolor=#E9E9E9
| 488817 ||  || — || June 27, 2005 || Kitt Peak || Spacewatch || — || align=right | 2.3 km || 
|-id=818 bgcolor=#E9E9E9
| 488818 ||  || — || June 29, 2005 || Kitt Peak || Spacewatch || — || align=right data-sort-value="0.97" | 970 m || 
|-id=819 bgcolor=#E9E9E9
| 488819 ||  || — || June 30, 2005 || Kitt Peak || Spacewatch || — || align=right | 1.9 km || 
|-id=820 bgcolor=#d6d6d6
| 488820 ||  || — || July 4, 2005 || Kitt Peak || Spacewatch || — || align=right | 3.0 km || 
|-id=821 bgcolor=#E9E9E9
| 488821 ||  || — || July 2, 2005 || Kitt Peak || Spacewatch || JUN || align=right data-sort-value="0.94" | 940 m || 
|-id=822 bgcolor=#E9E9E9
| 488822 ||  || — || July 2, 2005 || Kitt Peak || Spacewatch || — || align=right | 1.9 km || 
|-id=823 bgcolor=#fefefe
| 488823 ||  || — || July 2, 2005 || Kitt Peak || Spacewatch || NYS || align=right data-sort-value="0.55" | 550 m || 
|-id=824 bgcolor=#E9E9E9
| 488824 ||  || — || July 5, 2005 || Kitt Peak || Spacewatch || — || align=right | 1.3 km || 
|-id=825 bgcolor=#fefefe
| 488825 ||  || — || July 4, 2005 || Kitt Peak || Spacewatch || — || align=right data-sort-value="0.65" | 650 m || 
|-id=826 bgcolor=#E9E9E9
| 488826 ||  || — || July 6, 2005 || Kitt Peak || Spacewatch || — || align=right | 1.4 km || 
|-id=827 bgcolor=#E9E9E9
| 488827 ||  || — || July 5, 2005 || Siding Spring || SSS || — || align=right | 1.1 km || 
|-id=828 bgcolor=#fefefe
| 488828 ||  || — || July 18, 2005 || Palomar || NEAT || H || align=right data-sort-value="0.64" | 640 m || 
|-id=829 bgcolor=#E9E9E9
| 488829 ||  || — || August 4, 2005 || Palomar || NEAT || — || align=right data-sort-value="0.91" | 910 m || 
|-id=830 bgcolor=#fefefe
| 488830 ||  || — || August 26, 2005 || Anderson Mesa || LONEOS || — || align=right | 1.3 km || 
|-id=831 bgcolor=#fefefe
| 488831 ||  || — || August 25, 2005 || Palomar || NEAT || NYS || align=right data-sort-value="0.47" | 470 m || 
|-id=832 bgcolor=#E9E9E9
| 488832 ||  || — || August 25, 2005 || Palomar || NEAT || (1547) || align=right | 1.8 km || 
|-id=833 bgcolor=#fefefe
| 488833 ||  || — || August 28, 2005 || Kitt Peak || Spacewatch || NYS || align=right data-sort-value="0.59" | 590 m || 
|-id=834 bgcolor=#E9E9E9
| 488834 ||  || — || August 26, 2005 || Palomar || NEAT || — || align=right | 1.3 km || 
|-id=835 bgcolor=#E9E9E9
| 488835 ||  || — || August 29, 2005 || Socorro || LINEAR || — || align=right | 1.6 km || 
|-id=836 bgcolor=#E9E9E9
| 488836 ||  || — || August 29, 2005 || Kitt Peak || Spacewatch || — || align=right | 1.8 km || 
|-id=837 bgcolor=#fefefe
| 488837 ||  || — || August 29, 2005 || Kitt Peak || Spacewatch || — || align=right data-sort-value="0.54" | 540 m || 
|-id=838 bgcolor=#E9E9E9
| 488838 ||  || — || August 31, 2005 || Anderson Mesa || LONEOS || — || align=right | 2.4 km || 
|-id=839 bgcolor=#E9E9E9
| 488839 ||  || — || August 27, 2005 || Palomar || NEAT || JUN || align=right data-sort-value="0.94" | 940 m || 
|-id=840 bgcolor=#fefefe
| 488840 ||  || — || August 27, 2005 || Palomar || NEAT || MAS || align=right data-sort-value="0.44" | 440 m || 
|-id=841 bgcolor=#E9E9E9
| 488841 ||  || — || August 28, 2005 || Kitt Peak || Spacewatch || — || align=right | 1.9 km || 
|-id=842 bgcolor=#FA8072
| 488842 ||  || — || August 31, 2005 || Palomar || NEAT || H || align=right data-sort-value="0.57" | 570 m || 
|-id=843 bgcolor=#E9E9E9
| 488843 ||  || — || August 28, 2005 || Kitt Peak || Spacewatch || — || align=right | 2.0 km || 
|-id=844 bgcolor=#d6d6d6
| 488844 ||  || — || August 30, 2005 || Kitt Peak || Spacewatch || — || align=right | 2.3 km || 
|-id=845 bgcolor=#d6d6d6
| 488845 ||  || — || August 30, 2005 || Kitt Peak || Spacewatch || — || align=right | 2.2 km || 
|-id=846 bgcolor=#d6d6d6
| 488846 ||  || — || September 10, 2005 || Anderson Mesa || LONEOS || — || align=right | 1.9 km || 
|-id=847 bgcolor=#E9E9E9
| 488847 ||  || — || September 10, 2005 || Anderson Mesa || LONEOS ||  || align=right | 3.0 km || 
|-id=848 bgcolor=#d6d6d6
| 488848 ||  || — || August 31, 2005 || Kitt Peak || Spacewatch || — || align=right | 2.1 km || 
|-id=849 bgcolor=#E9E9E9
| 488849 ||  || — || August 27, 2005 || Anderson Mesa || LONEOS || — || align=right | 1.6 km || 
|-id=850 bgcolor=#fefefe
| 488850 ||  || — || September 23, 2005 || Catalina || CSS || — || align=right data-sort-value="0.67" | 670 m || 
|-id=851 bgcolor=#E9E9E9
| 488851 ||  || — || September 26, 2005 || Kitt Peak || Spacewatch || — || align=right | 1.7 km || 
|-id=852 bgcolor=#fefefe
| 488852 ||  || — || September 26, 2005 || Kitt Peak || Spacewatch || — || align=right data-sort-value="0.57" | 570 m || 
|-id=853 bgcolor=#d6d6d6
| 488853 ||  || — || September 23, 2005 || Kitt Peak || Spacewatch || — || align=right | 2.9 km || 
|-id=854 bgcolor=#d6d6d6
| 488854 ||  || — || September 24, 2005 || Kitt Peak || Spacewatch || — || align=right | 1.7 km || 
|-id=855 bgcolor=#E9E9E9
| 488855 ||  || — || September 24, 2005 || Kitt Peak || Spacewatch || — || align=right data-sort-value="0.57" | 570 m || 
|-id=856 bgcolor=#E9E9E9
| 488856 ||  || — || September 25, 2005 || Kitt Peak || Spacewatch || — || align=right | 1.4 km || 
|-id=857 bgcolor=#fefefe
| 488857 ||  || — || September 25, 2005 || Kitt Peak || Spacewatch || — || align=right data-sort-value="0.49" | 490 m || 
|-id=858 bgcolor=#fefefe
| 488858 ||  || — || September 26, 2005 || Kitt Peak || Spacewatch || — || align=right data-sort-value="0.78" | 780 m || 
|-id=859 bgcolor=#E9E9E9
| 488859 ||  || — || September 26, 2005 || Kitt Peak || Spacewatch || AGN || align=right | 1.0 km || 
|-id=860 bgcolor=#fefefe
| 488860 ||  || — || September 27, 2005 || Kitt Peak || Spacewatch || NYS || align=right data-sort-value="0.56" | 560 m || 
|-id=861 bgcolor=#E9E9E9
| 488861 ||  || — || September 24, 2005 || Kitt Peak || Spacewatch || — || align=right | 1.2 km || 
|-id=862 bgcolor=#E9E9E9
| 488862 ||  || — || September 24, 2005 || Kitt Peak || Spacewatch || — || align=right | 1.9 km || 
|-id=863 bgcolor=#d6d6d6
| 488863 ||  || — || September 24, 2005 || Kitt Peak || Spacewatch || — || align=right | 2.3 km || 
|-id=864 bgcolor=#fefefe
| 488864 ||  || — || September 24, 2005 || Kitt Peak || Spacewatch || — || align=right data-sort-value="0.64" | 640 m || 
|-id=865 bgcolor=#fefefe
| 488865 ||  || — || September 25, 2005 || Kitt Peak || Spacewatch || — || align=right data-sort-value="0.72" | 720 m || 
|-id=866 bgcolor=#d6d6d6
| 488866 ||  || — || September 25, 2005 || Kitt Peak || Spacewatch || — || align=right | 3.0 km || 
|-id=867 bgcolor=#fefefe
| 488867 ||  || — || September 26, 2005 || Palomar || NEAT || MAS || align=right data-sort-value="0.71" | 710 m || 
|-id=868 bgcolor=#fefefe
| 488868 ||  || — || September 26, 2005 || Kitt Peak || Spacewatch || H || align=right data-sort-value="0.61" | 610 m || 
|-id=869 bgcolor=#d6d6d6
| 488869 ||  || — || September 29, 2005 || Kitt Peak || Spacewatch || — || align=right | 2.4 km || 
|-id=870 bgcolor=#E9E9E9
| 488870 ||  || — || September 29, 2005 || Mount Lemmon || Mount Lemmon Survey || — || align=right | 1.9 km || 
|-id=871 bgcolor=#fefefe
| 488871 ||  || — || September 29, 2005 || Mount Lemmon || Mount Lemmon Survey || — || align=right data-sort-value="0.71" | 710 m || 
|-id=872 bgcolor=#fefefe
| 488872 ||  || — || September 30, 2005 || Palomar || NEAT || H || align=right data-sort-value="0.64" | 640 m || 
|-id=873 bgcolor=#FA8072
| 488873 ||  || — || September 24, 2005 || Kitt Peak || Spacewatch || — || align=right data-sort-value="0.91" | 910 m || 
|-id=874 bgcolor=#E9E9E9
| 488874 ||  || — || September 25, 2005 || Palomar || NEAT || — || align=right | 1.8 km || 
|-id=875 bgcolor=#fefefe
| 488875 ||  || — || September 25, 2005 || Kitt Peak || Spacewatch || — || align=right data-sort-value="0.45" | 450 m || 
|-id=876 bgcolor=#d6d6d6
| 488876 ||  || — || September 26, 2005 || Kitt Peak || Spacewatch || — || align=right | 2.4 km || 
|-id=877 bgcolor=#fefefe
| 488877 ||  || — || September 27, 2005 || Kitt Peak || Spacewatch || — || align=right data-sort-value="0.57" | 570 m || 
|-id=878 bgcolor=#E9E9E9
| 488878 ||  || — || September 27, 2005 || Palomar || NEAT || — || align=right | 1.3 km || 
|-id=879 bgcolor=#fefefe
| 488879 ||  || — || September 1, 2005 || Campo Imperatore || CINEOS || V || align=right data-sort-value="0.61" | 610 m || 
|-id=880 bgcolor=#fefefe
| 488880 ||  || — || September 29, 2005 || Kitt Peak || Spacewatch || — || align=right data-sort-value="0.75" | 750 m || 
|-id=881 bgcolor=#E9E9E9
| 488881 ||  || — || September 29, 2005 || Kitt Peak || Spacewatch || — || align=right | 1.9 km || 
|-id=882 bgcolor=#fefefe
| 488882 ||  || — || September 29, 2005 || Kitt Peak || Spacewatch || NYS || align=right data-sort-value="0.46" | 460 m || 
|-id=883 bgcolor=#FA8072
| 488883 ||  || — || August 29, 2005 || Socorro || LINEAR || — || align=right data-sort-value="0.91" | 910 m || 
|-id=884 bgcolor=#d6d6d6
| 488884 ||  || — || September 30, 2005 || Mount Lemmon || Mount Lemmon Survey || — || align=right | 1.7 km || 
|-id=885 bgcolor=#fefefe
| 488885 ||  || — || September 30, 2005 || Mount Lemmon || Mount Lemmon Survey || MAScritical || align=right data-sort-value="0.52" | 520 m || 
|-id=886 bgcolor=#fefefe
| 488886 ||  || — || September 30, 2005 || Kitt Peak || Spacewatch || — || align=right data-sort-value="0.69" | 690 m || 
|-id=887 bgcolor=#FA8072
| 488887 ||  || — || September 24, 2005 || Kitt Peak || Spacewatch || H || align=right data-sort-value="0.67" | 670 m || 
|-id=888 bgcolor=#d6d6d6
| 488888 ||  || — || September 25, 2005 || Kitt Peak || Spacewatch || 615 || align=right | 1.1 km || 
|-id=889 bgcolor=#fefefe
| 488889 ||  || — || September 30, 2005 || Kitt Peak || Spacewatch || — || align=right data-sort-value="0.54" | 540 m || 
|-id=890 bgcolor=#fefefe
| 488890 ||  || — || September 23, 2005 || Kitt Peak || Spacewatch || — || align=right data-sort-value="0.55" | 550 m || 
|-id=891 bgcolor=#fefefe
| 488891 ||  || — || August 29, 2005 || Kitt Peak || Spacewatch || — || align=right data-sort-value="0.69" | 690 m || 
|-id=892 bgcolor=#fefefe
| 488892 ||  || — || September 29, 2005 || Kitt Peak || Spacewatch || — || align=right data-sort-value="0.65" | 650 m || 
|-id=893 bgcolor=#fefefe
| 488893 ||  || — || October 1, 2005 || Kitt Peak || Spacewatch || — || align=right data-sort-value="0.60" | 600 m || 
|-id=894 bgcolor=#FA8072
| 488894 ||  || — || September 23, 2005 || Kitt Peak || Spacewatch || — || align=right data-sort-value="0.52" | 520 m || 
|-id=895 bgcolor=#fefefe
| 488895 ||  || — || September 29, 2005 || Kitt Peak || Spacewatch || — || align=right data-sort-value="0.79" | 790 m || 
|-id=896 bgcolor=#d6d6d6
| 488896 ||  || — || October 3, 2005 || Kitt Peak || Spacewatch || — || align=right | 1.7 km || 
|-id=897 bgcolor=#E9E9E9
| 488897 ||  || — || September 1, 2005 || Kitt Peak || Spacewatch || — || align=right | 2.0 km || 
|-id=898 bgcolor=#E9E9E9
| 488898 ||  || — || October 4, 2005 || Mount Lemmon || Mount Lemmon Survey || — || align=right data-sort-value="0.71" | 710 m || 
|-id=899 bgcolor=#fefefe
| 488899 ||  || — || October 4, 2005 || Mount Lemmon || Mount Lemmon Survey || V || align=right data-sort-value="0.51" | 510 m || 
|-id=900 bgcolor=#fefefe
| 488900 ||  || — || October 6, 2005 || Catalina || CSS || — || align=right data-sort-value="0.52" | 520 m || 
|}

488901–489000 

|-bgcolor=#FA8072
| 488901 ||  || — || October 7, 2005 || Mount Lemmon || Mount Lemmon Survey || — || align=right data-sort-value="0.66" | 660 m || 
|-id=902 bgcolor=#E9E9E9
| 488902 ||  || — || September 29, 2005 || Kitt Peak || Spacewatch || — || align=right | 2.0 km || 
|-id=903 bgcolor=#E9E9E9
| 488903 ||  || — || October 3, 2005 || Kitt Peak || Spacewatch || — || align=right | 1.4 km || 
|-id=904 bgcolor=#fefefe
| 488904 ||  || — || September 23, 2005 || Kitt Peak || Spacewatch || — || align=right data-sort-value="0.58" | 580 m || 
|-id=905 bgcolor=#d6d6d6
| 488905 ||  || — || October 5, 2005 || Mount Lemmon || Mount Lemmon Survey || THM || align=right | 1.7 km || 
|-id=906 bgcolor=#fefefe
| 488906 ||  || — || September 25, 2005 || Kitt Peak || Spacewatch || critical || align=right data-sort-value="0.57" | 570 m || 
|-id=907 bgcolor=#fefefe
| 488907 ||  || — || September 26, 2005 || Kitt Peak || Spacewatch || — || align=right data-sort-value="0.53" | 530 m || 
|-id=908 bgcolor=#fefefe
| 488908 ||  || — || October 7, 2005 || Mount Lemmon || Mount Lemmon Survey || critical || align=right data-sort-value="0.54" | 540 m || 
|-id=909 bgcolor=#fefefe
| 488909 ||  || — || September 29, 2005 || Kitt Peak || Spacewatch || — || align=right data-sort-value="0.65" | 650 m || 
|-id=910 bgcolor=#E9E9E9
| 488910 ||  || — || October 7, 2005 || Kitt Peak || Spacewatch || — || align=right | 1.0 km || 
|-id=911 bgcolor=#fefefe
| 488911 ||  || — || September 26, 2005 || Kitt Peak || Spacewatch || Vcritical || align=right data-sort-value="0.47" | 470 m || 
|-id=912 bgcolor=#E9E9E9
| 488912 ||  || — || September 25, 2005 || Kitt Peak || Spacewatch || — || align=right | 1.8 km || 
|-id=913 bgcolor=#E9E9E9
| 488913 ||  || — || September 14, 2005 || Catalina || CSS || — || align=right | 2.4 km || 
|-id=914 bgcolor=#d6d6d6
| 488914 ||  || — || October 1, 2005 || Mount Lemmon || Mount Lemmon Survey || — || align=right | 2.7 km || 
|-id=915 bgcolor=#E9E9E9
| 488915 ||  || — || October 12, 2005 || Kitt Peak || Spacewatch || — || align=right | 2.0 km || 
|-id=916 bgcolor=#d6d6d6
| 488916 ||  || — || October 1, 2005 || Kitt Peak || Spacewatch || — || align=right | 2.0 km || 
|-id=917 bgcolor=#fefefe
| 488917 ||  || — || October 20, 2005 || Junk Bond || D. Healy || — || align=right data-sort-value="0.68" | 680 m || 
|-id=918 bgcolor=#d6d6d6
| 488918 ||  || — || September 29, 2005 || Mount Lemmon || Mount Lemmon Survey || — || align=right | 2.5 km || 
|-id=919 bgcolor=#E9E9E9
| 488919 ||  || — || October 25, 2005 || Kitt Peak || Spacewatch || — || align=right | 2.1 km || 
|-id=920 bgcolor=#d6d6d6
| 488920 ||  || — || October 21, 2005 || Palomar || NEAT || — || align=right | 2.3 km || 
|-id=921 bgcolor=#E9E9E9
| 488921 ||  || — || October 23, 2005 || Kitt Peak || Spacewatch || EUN || align=right | 1.4 km || 
|-id=922 bgcolor=#fefefe
| 488922 ||  || — || October 5, 2005 || Kitt Peak || Spacewatch || — || align=right data-sort-value="0.62" | 620 m || 
|-id=923 bgcolor=#d6d6d6
| 488923 ||  || — || October 24, 2005 || Kitt Peak || Spacewatch || — || align=right | 2.0 km || 
|-id=924 bgcolor=#fefefe
| 488924 ||  || — || October 24, 2005 || Kitt Peak || Spacewatch || MAS || align=right data-sort-value="0.62" | 620 m || 
|-id=925 bgcolor=#E9E9E9
| 488925 ||  || — || October 22, 2005 || Kitt Peak || Spacewatch || — || align=right | 1.2 km || 
|-id=926 bgcolor=#E9E9E9
| 488926 ||  || — || October 8, 2005 || Socorro || LINEAR || — || align=right | 2.7 km || 
|-id=927 bgcolor=#d6d6d6
| 488927 ||  || — || October 25, 2005 || Mount Lemmon || Mount Lemmon Survey || THM || align=right | 2.3 km || 
|-id=928 bgcolor=#E9E9E9
| 488928 ||  || — || October 22, 2005 || Kitt Peak || Spacewatch || — || align=right | 1.3 km || 
|-id=929 bgcolor=#d6d6d6
| 488929 ||  || — || October 23, 2005 || Catalina || CSS || — || align=right | 2.5 km || 
|-id=930 bgcolor=#d6d6d6
| 488930 ||  || — || October 24, 2005 || Palomar || NEAT || — || align=right | 2.0 km || 
|-id=931 bgcolor=#E9E9E9
| 488931 ||  || — || October 22, 2005 || Kitt Peak || Spacewatch || — || align=right | 1.5 km || 
|-id=932 bgcolor=#fefefe
| 488932 ||  || — || October 22, 2005 || Kitt Peak || Spacewatch || (2076) || align=right data-sort-value="0.78" | 780 m || 
|-id=933 bgcolor=#E9E9E9
| 488933 ||  || — || October 22, 2005 || Kitt Peak || Spacewatch || — || align=right | 1.9 km || 
|-id=934 bgcolor=#fefefe
| 488934 ||  || — || October 22, 2005 || Kitt Peak || Spacewatch || — || align=right data-sort-value="0.83" | 830 m || 
|-id=935 bgcolor=#fefefe
| 488935 ||  || — || October 22, 2005 || Kitt Peak || Spacewatch || — || align=right data-sort-value="0.77" | 770 m || 
|-id=936 bgcolor=#fefefe
| 488936 ||  || — || October 22, 2005 || Kitt Peak || Spacewatch || NYS || align=right data-sort-value="0.60" | 600 m || 
|-id=937 bgcolor=#E9E9E9
| 488937 ||  || — || October 24, 2005 || Kitt Peak || Spacewatch || — || align=right | 1.3 km || 
|-id=938 bgcolor=#E9E9E9
| 488938 ||  || — || October 11, 2005 || Kitt Peak || Spacewatch || — || align=right data-sort-value="0.90" | 900 m || 
|-id=939 bgcolor=#d6d6d6
| 488939 ||  || — || October 25, 2005 || Kitt Peak || Spacewatch || BRA || align=right | 1.4 km || 
|-id=940 bgcolor=#fefefe
| 488940 ||  || — || October 25, 2005 || Catalina || CSS || H || align=right data-sort-value="0.74" | 740 m || 
|-id=941 bgcolor=#fefefe
| 488941 ||  || — || October 26, 2005 || Kitt Peak || Spacewatch || — || align=right data-sort-value="0.94" | 940 m || 
|-id=942 bgcolor=#fefefe
| 488942 ||  || — || October 26, 2005 || Kitt Peak || Spacewatch || — || align=right data-sort-value="0.66" | 660 m || 
|-id=943 bgcolor=#FA8072
| 488943 ||  || — || October 26, 2005 || Kitt Peak || Spacewatch || — || align=right data-sort-value="0.76" | 760 m || 
|-id=944 bgcolor=#E9E9E9
| 488944 ||  || — || September 29, 2005 || Kitt Peak || Spacewatch || — || align=right | 1.1 km || 
|-id=945 bgcolor=#fefefe
| 488945 ||  || — || September 30, 2005 || Mount Lemmon || Mount Lemmon Survey || NYS || align=right data-sort-value="0.39" | 390 m || 
|-id=946 bgcolor=#E9E9E9
| 488946 ||  || — || October 1, 2005 || Mount Lemmon || Mount Lemmon Survey || — || align=right | 1.0 km || 
|-id=947 bgcolor=#d6d6d6
| 488947 ||  || — || October 24, 2005 || Kitt Peak || Spacewatch || — || align=right | 1.8 km || 
|-id=948 bgcolor=#E9E9E9
| 488948 ||  || — || October 24, 2005 || Kitt Peak || Spacewatch || HOF || align=right | 2.4 km || 
|-id=949 bgcolor=#fefefe
| 488949 ||  || — || September 30, 2005 || Mount Lemmon || Mount Lemmon Survey || — || align=right data-sort-value="0.91" | 910 m || 
|-id=950 bgcolor=#fefefe
| 488950 ||  || — || October 24, 2005 || Kitt Peak || Spacewatch || MAS || align=right data-sort-value="0.54" | 540 m || 
|-id=951 bgcolor=#d6d6d6
| 488951 ||  || — || October 24, 2005 || Kitt Peak || Spacewatch || — || align=right | 3.0 km || 
|-id=952 bgcolor=#fefefe
| 488952 ||  || — || October 24, 2005 || Kitt Peak || Spacewatch || — || align=right data-sort-value="0.59" | 590 m || 
|-id=953 bgcolor=#fefefe
| 488953 ||  || — || October 25, 2005 || Mount Lemmon || Mount Lemmon Survey || — || align=right data-sort-value="0.49" | 490 m || 
|-id=954 bgcolor=#E9E9E9
| 488954 ||  || — || October 22, 2005 || Kitt Peak || Spacewatch || — || align=right | 1.8 km || 
|-id=955 bgcolor=#E9E9E9
| 488955 ||  || — || September 29, 2005 || Mount Lemmon || Mount Lemmon Survey || HOF || align=right | 2.3 km || 
|-id=956 bgcolor=#fefefe
| 488956 ||  || — || September 25, 2005 || Kitt Peak || Spacewatch || — || align=right data-sort-value="0.54" | 540 m || 
|-id=957 bgcolor=#E9E9E9
| 488957 ||  || — || October 27, 2005 || Kitt Peak || Spacewatch || AGN || align=right data-sort-value="0.95" | 950 m || 
|-id=958 bgcolor=#fefefe
| 488958 ||  || — || October 25, 2005 || Kitt Peak || Spacewatch || Vcritical || align=right data-sort-value="0.49" | 490 m || 
|-id=959 bgcolor=#fefefe
| 488959 ||  || — || October 25, 2005 || Kitt Peak || Spacewatch || MAS || align=right data-sort-value="0.53" | 530 m || 
|-id=960 bgcolor=#E9E9E9
| 488960 ||  || — || October 25, 2005 || Kitt Peak || Spacewatch || — || align=right | 1.8 km || 
|-id=961 bgcolor=#d6d6d6
| 488961 ||  || — || October 28, 2005 || Mount Lemmon || Mount Lemmon Survey || THM || align=right | 1.9 km || 
|-id=962 bgcolor=#E9E9E9
| 488962 ||  || — || October 26, 2005 || Kitt Peak || Spacewatch || — || align=right | 1.1 km || 
|-id=963 bgcolor=#fefefe
| 488963 ||  || — || October 22, 2005 || Kitt Peak || Spacewatch || MAS || align=right data-sort-value="0.65" | 650 m || 
|-id=964 bgcolor=#d6d6d6
| 488964 ||  || — || October 26, 2005 || Kitt Peak || Spacewatch || — || align=right | 2.6 km || 
|-id=965 bgcolor=#E9E9E9
| 488965 ||  || — || October 12, 2005 || Kitt Peak || Spacewatch || — || align=right | 1.7 km || 
|-id=966 bgcolor=#E9E9E9
| 488966 ||  || — || October 1, 2005 || Kitt Peak || Spacewatch || — || align=right | 1.2 km || 
|-id=967 bgcolor=#E9E9E9
| 488967 ||  || — || October 26, 2005 || Kitt Peak || Spacewatch || — || align=right | 1.2 km || 
|-id=968 bgcolor=#fefefe
| 488968 ||  || — || October 26, 2005 || Kitt Peak || Spacewatch || — || align=right data-sort-value="0.56" | 560 m || 
|-id=969 bgcolor=#fefefe
| 488969 ||  || — || October 26, 2005 || Kitt Peak || Spacewatch || — || align=right data-sort-value="0.71" | 710 m || 
|-id=970 bgcolor=#E9E9E9
| 488970 ||  || — || October 26, 2005 || Kitt Peak || Spacewatch || — || align=right | 1.4 km || 
|-id=971 bgcolor=#E9E9E9
| 488971 ||  || — || October 26, 2005 || Kitt Peak || Spacewatch || — || align=right | 1.6 km || 
|-id=972 bgcolor=#d6d6d6
| 488972 ||  || — || October 29, 2005 || Catalina || CSS || — || align=right | 2.2 km || 
|-id=973 bgcolor=#E9E9E9
| 488973 ||  || — || October 29, 2005 || Kitt Peak || Spacewatch || HOF || align=right | 2.0 km || 
|-id=974 bgcolor=#E9E9E9
| 488974 ||  || — || October 29, 2005 || Kitt Peak || Spacewatch || — || align=right | 2.1 km || 
|-id=975 bgcolor=#d6d6d6
| 488975 ||  || — || October 22, 2005 || Kitt Peak || Spacewatch || — || align=right | 2.0 km || 
|-id=976 bgcolor=#fefefe
| 488976 ||  || — || October 29, 2005 || Mount Lemmon || Mount Lemmon Survey || — || align=right data-sort-value="0.84" | 840 m || 
|-id=977 bgcolor=#E9E9E9
| 488977 ||  || — || October 22, 2005 || Kitt Peak || Spacewatch || — || align=right | 2.9 km || 
|-id=978 bgcolor=#fefefe
| 488978 ||  || — || October 8, 2005 || Socorro || LINEAR || — || align=right data-sort-value="0.77" | 770 m || 
|-id=979 bgcolor=#E9E9E9
| 488979 ||  || — || October 29, 2005 || Catalina || CSS || — || align=right | 1.7 km || 
|-id=980 bgcolor=#d6d6d6
| 488980 ||  || — || October 29, 2005 || Catalina || CSS || Tj (2.98) || align=right | 3.2 km || 
|-id=981 bgcolor=#d6d6d6
| 488981 ||  || — || September 29, 2005 || Mount Lemmon || Mount Lemmon Survey || — || align=right | 1.8 km || 
|-id=982 bgcolor=#E9E9E9
| 488982 ||  || — || September 30, 2005 || Mount Lemmon || Mount Lemmon Survey || — || align=right | 1.6 km || 
|-id=983 bgcolor=#fefefe
| 488983 ||  || — || October 10, 2005 || Kitt Peak || Spacewatch || — || align=right data-sort-value="0.62" | 620 m || 
|-id=984 bgcolor=#d6d6d6
| 488984 ||  || — || October 25, 2005 || Kitt Peak || Spacewatch || — || align=right | 2.1 km || 
|-id=985 bgcolor=#fefefe
| 488985 ||  || — || September 29, 2005 || Mount Lemmon || Mount Lemmon Survey || — || align=right data-sort-value="0.65" | 650 m || 
|-id=986 bgcolor=#d6d6d6
| 488986 ||  || — || October 27, 2005 || Kitt Peak || Spacewatch || — || align=right | 1.9 km || 
|-id=987 bgcolor=#fefefe
| 488987 ||  || — || October 27, 2005 || Kitt Peak || Spacewatch || — || align=right data-sort-value="0.62" | 620 m || 
|-id=988 bgcolor=#fefefe
| 488988 ||  || — || October 22, 2005 || Kitt Peak || Spacewatch || — || align=right data-sort-value="0.57" | 570 m || 
|-id=989 bgcolor=#E9E9E9
| 488989 ||  || — || October 26, 2005 || Socorro || LINEAR || JUN || align=right | 1.3 km || 
|-id=990 bgcolor=#fefefe
| 488990 ||  || — || October 27, 2005 || Kitt Peak || Spacewatch || — || align=right data-sort-value="0.75" | 750 m || 
|-id=991 bgcolor=#d6d6d6
| 488991 ||  || — || October 22, 2005 || Kitt Peak || Spacewatch || — || align=right | 1.8 km || 
|-id=992 bgcolor=#fefefe
| 488992 ||  || — || October 30, 2005 || Mount Lemmon || Mount Lemmon Survey || — || align=right data-sort-value="0.60" | 600 m || 
|-id=993 bgcolor=#fefefe
| 488993 ||  || — || October 29, 2005 || Mount Lemmon || Mount Lemmon Survey || — || align=right data-sort-value="0.63" | 630 m || 
|-id=994 bgcolor=#E9E9E9
| 488994 ||  || — || October 25, 2005 || Kitt Peak || Spacewatch || — || align=right | 1.8 km || 
|-id=995 bgcolor=#E9E9E9
| 488995 ||  || — || October 29, 2005 || Mount Lemmon || Mount Lemmon Survey || — || align=right | 1.9 km || 
|-id=996 bgcolor=#fefefe
| 488996 ||  || — || October 31, 2005 || Mount Lemmon || Mount Lemmon Survey || — || align=right data-sort-value="0.69" | 690 m || 
|-id=997 bgcolor=#E9E9E9
| 488997 ||  || — || October 28, 2005 || Mount Lemmon || Mount Lemmon Survey || — || align=right | 1.6 km || 
|-id=998 bgcolor=#d6d6d6
| 488998 ||  || — || October 30, 2005 || Kitt Peak || Spacewatch || — || align=right | 2.7 km || 
|-id=999 bgcolor=#E9E9E9
| 488999 ||  || — || October 27, 2005 || Kitt Peak || Spacewatch || HOF || align=right | 2.0 km || 
|-id=000 bgcolor=#E9E9E9
| 489000 ||  || — || October 28, 2005 || Kitt Peak || Spacewatch || — || align=right | 2.8 km || 
|}

References

External links 
 Discovery Circumstances: Numbered Minor Planets (485001)–(490000) (IAU Minor Planet Center)

0488